This list of the Paleozoic life of New York contains the various prehistoric life-forms whose fossilized remains have been reported from within the US state of New York and are between 538.8 and 252.17 million years of age.

A

 †Acanthoclema
 †Acanthoclema aspera
 †Acanthoclema asperum
 †Acanthoclymenia
 †Acanthoclymenia genundewa
 †Acanthoclymenia neapolitana
 †Acanthocrinus
 †Acanthocrinus spinosus
  †Acanthodus
 †Acanthodus uncinatus
 †Acanthoparypha – tentative report
 †Acanthoscapha
 †Achatella
 †Achatella achates
 †Acheilops
 †Acheilops masonensis
 †Acidiphorus
 †Acidiphorus whittingtoni
  †Acidiscus
  †Acimetopus
 †Acinophyllum
 †Acinopteria
 †Aclistocrinus
 †Aclistocrinus capistratus
 †Acodus
 †Acodus similaris
 †Acrogenia
 †Acrospirifer
 †Acrospirifer duodenaria
 †Acrospirifer macrothyris
 †Acrothele
 †Acrotreta
 †Actinoceras
 †Actinoceras ruedemanni
 †Actinoceras ruedemonni
 †Actinoceras vertebratum
 †Actinodesma
 †Actinodesma erectum
 †Actinophyllum
 †Actinopterella
 †Actinopteria
 †Actinopteria boydi
 †Actinopteria boydii
 †Actinopteria decussata
 †Actinopteria muricatus
 †Actinopteria recumbant
 †Actinopteria subdessucata
 †Actinostromella
 †Actinostromella vaiverensis
 †Actinoxylon
 †Actinoxylon banksii
 †Aculeatarbus – type locality for genus
 †Aculeatarbus depressus – type locality for species
   †Acutiramus
 †Acutiramus floweri – type locality for species
 †Acutiramus macrophthalmus
 †Adelphobolbina
 †Adelphobolbina medialis – type locality for species
 †Aechmina
 †Aechminaria – tentative report
 †Aesopomum
 †Aglaeoglypta
 †Aglaeoglypta koeneni
 †Aglaeoglypta maera
 †Aglaoglypta
 †Aglaoglypta koeneni – type locality for species
 †Aglaoglypta maera
  †Agoniatites
 †Agoniatites discoideus
 †Agoniatites expansus
 †Agoniatites nodiferus
  †Agraulos
 †Agraulos saratogensis
 †Aknisophyllum – type locality for genus
 †Aknisophyllum consuitum – type locality for species
 †Alaionema
 †Alaionema crenulatum
 †Alanella
 †Allanella
 †Allanella tullia
 †Allanella tullius
 †Allenella
 †Allenella tullia
 †Allenella tullius
 †Alleynia
 †Alleynia americana
 †Allotrioceras
 †Allotrioceras bifurcatum
 †Allumettoceras
 †Allumettoceras giganteum
 †Ambocoelia
 †Ambocoelia gregaria
 †Ambocoelia praeumbonata
 †Ambocoelia umbonata
 †Ambonychia
 †Ambonychia praecursa
 †Ambonychiopsis
 †Ambonychiopsis curvata
 †Amorphognathus
 †Amorphognathus tvaerensis
 †Amphicoelia
 †Amphicoelia orbiculoides
 †Amphicoelia ordiculoides
 †Amphidoxodendron
 †Amphidoxodendron dichotomum
 †Amphigenia
 †Amphigenia curta
 †Amphigenia elongata
 †Amphilicas
 †Amphilicas cornutus
 †Amphilichas
 †Amphilichas minganensis
 †Amphiocoelia
 †Amphissella
 †Amphissella papillosa – type locality for species
 †Amphistrophia
 †Amphistrophia striata
 †Amphizona
 †Amphizona asceta
 †Amplexiphyllum
 †Amplexiphyllum hamiltoniae
 †Amplexograptus
  †Amplexopora
 †Amplexopora minnesotensis
 †Amplexopora winchelli
 †Amplexus
 †Amplexus hamiltoniae
  †Analox
 †Anamesocrinus
 †Anamesocrinus lutheri
 †Anamesocrinus spinobrachiatus – type locality for species
 †Anastrophia
 †Anastrophia brevirostris
 †Anastrophia interplicata
 †Anastrophia verneuili
 †Anazyga
 †Anazyga recurvirostra
 †Anchiopsis
 †Anchiopsis anchiops
 †Ancillotoechia
 †Ancillotoechia obtusiplicata
 †Ancistrorhyncha
 †Ancyrocrinus
 †Ancyrocrinus bulbosus
 †Aneurophyton
 †Aneurophyton germanicum
 †Aneurophyton hallii
 †Aneurophyton rachides
 †Aneurospora
 †Aneurospora heterodontus – or unidentified comparable form
 †Aneurospora semizonalis
 †Anisotechnophorus
 †Anisotechnophorus nuculitiformis – type locality for species
 †Annoceras
 †Annoceras costatum
 †Annoceras multicameratum
 †Anomalocystites
 †Anomalocystites coronatus
 †Anoplia
 †Anoplia nucleata
 †Anoplotheca
 †Anostylostroma
 †Anrangeroceras
 †Anrangeroceras repens
 †Anrangeroceras whitehallense
 †Antholites
 †Aorocrinus
 †Aorocrinus formosus
 †Aparchites
 †Aparchites minutissimus
  †Aphetoceras
 †Aphetoceras attenuatum
 †Aphetoceras farnsworthi
 †Aphetoceras ruedemanni
 †Aphyllopteris
 †Aphyllopteris delwarensis
 †Aphyllum
 †Aphyllum fascicularium
 †Apianurus
 †Apianurus narrawayi
 †Apiculiretusispora
 †Apiculiretusispora brandtii
 †Apiocystites
 †Apiocystites elegans
 †Apsidognathus
 †Apsidognathus tuberculatus
 †Arachnoxylon
 †Arachnoxylon kopfi
 †Archaeacarus – type locality for genus
 †Archaeacarus dubinini – type locality for species
    †Archaeopteris
 †Archaeopteris halliana
 †Archaeopteris hibernica
 †Archaeopteris macilenta
 †Archaeopteris obtusa
 †Archaeopteris sphenophyllifolia
 †Archaeosigillaria
 †Archaeosigillaria primaeva
 †Archaeosigillaria vanuxemi
 †Archaeosigillaria vanuxemii
 †Archegonaspis
 †Archinacella
 †Archinacella deformata
 †Archinacella magna – type locality for species
 †Archinacella parva – type locality for species
 †Archinacella proprius
 †Archinacella pulaskiensis
 †Archoceras – tentative report
  †Arctinurus
 †Arctinurus boltoni
 †Arctinurus nereus
   Argyrotheca
 †Argyrotheca cuneata
 †Arjamannia – tentative report
 †Arthracantha
 †Arthracantha ithacensis
 †Arthroacantha
 †Arthroacantha carpenteri
 †Arthroclema
 †Arthrophycus
 †Arthrophycus alleganiensis
 †Arthrophycus alleghaniensis
 †Arthrostylus
 †Arthrostylus tenius
 †Asaphocinus
 †Asaphocrinus
 †Asaphocrinus ornatus
  †Asaphus
 †Asaphus alpha
 †Asaphus beta
 †Asaphus gamma
 †Ascograptus
 †Asinomphalus
 †Asinomphalus antiqua
 †Asperconella
 †Asperconella gloriae – type locality for species
 †Asperconella troyensis
 †Aspidocrinus
 †Asteropteris
 †Asteropteris kopfi
 †Astraeospongium
 †Atactotoechus
 †Atactotoechus acritus
 †Atactotoechus kayi
 †Atalacrinus
 †Atalacrinus arctus
 †Atelelasma
 †Atelelasma multicosta
 †Ateleocystites
 †Ateleocystites balanoides
 †Atelestrocrinus
 †Athabaskiella
 †Athroacantha
 †Athyris
 †Athyris angelica
 †Athyris cora
 †Athyris polita
 †Athyris spiriferiodes
 †Athyris spiriferoides
 †Atlanticocoelia
 †Atlanticocoelia acutiplicata
 †Atopostroma
 †Atops
 †Atractocrinus
 †Atractocrinus kopfi
 †Atribonium
 †Atribonium halli
 †Atrypa
 †Atrypa gibbosa
  †Atrypa reticularis
 †Atrypa rugosa
 †Atrypina
 †Atrypina diparilis
 †Atrypina disparilis
 †Atrypina rugosa
  †Attercopus
 †Attercopus fimbriunguis
 †Attercopus fimbriungus
 †Aulacognathus
 †Aulacognathus latus
 †Aulatornoceras
 †Aulatornoceras auris
 †Aulatornoceras eifliense
 †Aulatornoceras paucistriatum
 †Aulatornoceras rhysum
 †Aulocystis
 †Aulocystis commensalis
 †Aulocystis cooperi
 †Aulocystis dichotoma
 †Aulocystis jacksoni
  †Aulopora
 †Aulopora microbuccinata
 †Aulopora schohariae
 †Aulopora serpens
 †Auroraspora – or unidentified comparable form
 †Auroraspora macromanifestus
 Avicula – tentative report
  †Aviculopecten
 †Aviculopecten ornatus

B

 †Bactrites
 †Bactrocrinites
 †Bactrocrinites fieldi
 †Bactrotheca – report made of unidentified related form or using admittedly obsolete nomenclature
 †Bactrotheca emmonsi
 Bairdia
 †Bairdia summacuminata
 †Balbiniconcha
 †Balbiniconcha hebe
 †Baltagnostus
 †Balticopora
 †Balticopora tenuimurale
 †Baltoceras
 †Baltoceras pusillum – tentative report
 †Barinophyton
 †Barinophyton citrulliforme
 †Barrandeoceras
 †Barrandeoceras natator
 †Barrandeophyllum
 †Barrandeophyllum reimanni
 †Barrandeophyllum simplex
 †Barroisella
 †Barroisella campbelli – or unidentified comparable form
 †Barynema
 †Barynema lirata
 †Barynema multilirata
 †Basidechenella
 †Basidechenella rowi
 †Basilicus
 †Basilicus barrandi
 †Basilicus whittingtoni
 †Bassleridiscus – type locality for genus
 †Bassleridiscus mohawkensis – type locality for species
 †Bassleroceras
 †Bassleroceras beekmanense
 †Bassleroceras champlainense – type locality for species
 †Bassleroceras kirbyi
 †Bassleroceras microscopium
 †Bassleroceras perseus
 †Bassleroceras smithbasinense – type locality for species
 †Bassleroceras spissiseptum
 †Bassleroceras triangulum – type locality for species
 †Bassleroceras vassarina – type locality for species
  †Bathydiscus
 †Bathyrellus
 †Bathyrellus brevispinus
 †Bathyurellus
 †Bathyurellus platypus
 †Bathyuriscidella
 †Bathyuriscus
 †Bathyurus
 †Bathyurus extans
 †Bathyurus longispinus
 †Batostoma
 †Batostoma campensis
 †Batostoma chazyensis
 †Batostoma lanensis
 †Batostoma sheldonensis
 †Batostomella
 †Batostomella granulifera
 †Beachia
 †Beecherella
  †Bellacartwrightia
 †Bellacartwrightia calliteles
 †Bellacartwrightia phyllocaudata
 †Bellefontia
 †Bellefontia gyracantha
  †Bellerophon
 †Bellerophon helena
 †Bellerophon pelops
 †Bellerophon shelbiensis – type locality for species
 †Belodina
 †Bembexia
 †Bembexia insolita – type locality for species
 †Benthamaspis
 †Benthamaspis striata – or unidentified comparable form
 †Benthanyphyllum
 †Bergstroemognathus
 †Bergstroemognathus extensus
 †Berounella
 †Bertiella
 †Bethanyphyllum
 †Bethanyphyllum robustum
 †Bethanyphyllum robustus
 †Beyrichia
 †Beyrichia lakemontensis – or unidentified related form
 †Beyrichia veronica
 †Bicia
 †Bideirella
 †Bideirella reticulata
 †Bieberiana
 †Bieberiana gowandense – type locality for species
 †Billingsestraea
 †Billingsestraea varneuili
 †Bilobia
 †Bilobia pisum
 †Biornatispora
 †Biornatispora dentata
 †Biornatispora pseudospinosa
 †Birdsallella
 †Birdsallella catena – type locality for species
 †Birdsallella devonica
 †Blastoidocrinus
 †Blastoidocrinus carchariaedens
 †Blastoidocrinus expansa
 †Blotherophyllum
 †Blothrophyllum
 †Blothrophyllum decorticatum
 †Blothrophyllum promiseum
 †Blothrophyllum promissum
 †Bolaspidella
 †Bolbocephalus
  †Bolboparia
  †Bolboporites
 †Bolboporites americanus
 †Bollia
 †Bollia hindei
 †Bonnia
 †Botryllopora
 †Botryllopora socialis
 †Botryocrinus
 †Botryocrinus reimanni
 †Botsfordia
 †Botsfordia caelata
 †Boucotinskia
 †Boucotinskia sulcata
 †Boucotinskia sulcatus
 †Bowmania
 †Bowmania pennsylvanica – or unidentified comparable form
 †Brachiocrinus
 †Brachiocrinus nodosarius
 †Brachyopterus
 †Brachyprion
 †Breenops
 †Breenops boothi
 †Breviphrentis
 †Breviphrentis roemeri
 †Breviphrentis variabilis
 †Breviphrentis yandelli
 †Briantelasma – type locality for genus
 †Briantelasma americanum – type locality for species
 †Briantelasma knoxboroense – type locality for species
 †Briantelasma knoxboroensis
 †Bucanella
 †Bucania
 †Bucania bellapuncta
 †Bucania stigmosa
 †Bucania sulcatina
 †Bucanopsis
 †Buchiola
 †Buchiola retrostriata
 †Buehleroceras
 †Buehleroceras arcuatum
 †Buehleroceras infundibulum
 †Buehleroceras sinuatum
  †Buffalopterus
 †Buffalopterus pustulosus
 †Bufina
 †Bufina bicornuta
 †Bumastoides
 †Bumastoides aplatus
 †Bumastoides gardenensis
 †Bumastoides milleri
   †Bumastus
 †Bumastus ioxus
 †Bunaia
 †Buthograptus
 †Buthograptus laxus
 †Buthotrephis
 †Buthotrephis gracilis
 †Buthotrephis palmata
 †Buthotrephis ramosa
 †Byssonychia
 †Byssonychia praecursa
 †Byssonychia radiata
 Bythocypris
 †Bythocypris cylindrica
 †Bythocypris lucasensis
 †Bythocypris phaseoella – type locality for species
 †Bythocypris subquadrata
 †Bythocypris transptyxis – type locality for species
 †Bythocypris tubercula – type locality for species
 †Bythocyproidea
 †Bythocyproidea eriensis – or unidentified comparable form
 †Bythopora

C

 †Cabrieroceras
 †Cabrieroceras plebeiforme
 †Cairoa
 †Cairoa lamanekii
 †Calacanthopora
 †Calacanthopora senticosa
 †Calamophyton
 †Calamophyton bicephalum
 †Calamopitys
 †Calamopitys eupuncatata
 †Calceocrinus
 †Calceocrinus chrysalis
 †Calliocrinus
 †Callipleura
 †Callipleura nobilis
 †Callistocrinus
 †Callistocrinus tesselatus
 †Callixylon
 †Callixylon erianum
 †Callixylon petryi
 †Callixylon Zalesskyi – or unidentified comparable form
 †Callixylon zalesskyi
 †Callocystites
 †Callocystites jewetti
 †Calodiscus
 †Calodiscus lobatus
 †Calvibembexia
 †Calvibembexia sulcomarginata
 †Calvinella – report made of unidentified related form or using admittedly obsolete nomenclature
 †Calvinella prethoparia
  †Calymene
 †Calymene clintoni
  †Calymene niagarensis
 †Calymenella
 †Calymenella rostrata
 †Calyptaulax
 †Calyptaulax annulata
 †Calyptaulax callicephalus
 †Calyptosporites – or unidentified comparable form
 †Calyptosporites velatus
 †Camarotoechia
 †Camarotoechia acinus
 †Camarotoechia aequiradiata
 †Camarotoechia altiplicata
 †Camarotoechia billingsi
 †Camarotoechia constricta
 †Camarotoechia gongregata
 †Camarotoechia humilis
 †Camarotoechia litchfieldensis
 †Camarotoechia navicella
 †Camarotoechia neglecta
 †Camarotoechia obtusiplicata
 †Camarotoechia obtusplicata
 †Camarotoechia pauciplicata
 †Camarotoechia pristinus
 †Camarotoechia robusta
 †Camarotoechia saxatilis
 †Camarotoechia saxatillis
 †Camarotoechia semiplicata
 †Camarotoechia tethys
 †Camerella
 †Camerella varians
 †Camerella ventricosa
  †Cameroceras
 †Cameroceras trentonense
 †Campbelloceras
 †Campbelloceras rotundum
 †Caninia
 †Caninia complexa
 †Caninia tabulata
 †Cannapora
 †Cannapora junciformis
 †Cannopora
 †Cannopora junciformis
  †Carcinosoma
 †Carcinosoma scorpionis
 †Carcinosoma spiniferus
 †Cardiograptus
 †Carinaropsis – type locality for genus
 †Carinaropsis carinata – type locality for species
 †Cariniferella
 †Cariniferella carinata
 †Cariniferella tioga
 †Carinoceras
 †Carinoceras vagans – type locality for species
 †Carniodus
 †Carniodus carnulus
 †Carolinites
 †Carolinites tasmanensis
 †Cartersoceras
 †Cartersoceras noveboracense – type locality for species
 †Carydium
 †Carydium bellistriata
 †Carydium clarkei – type locality for species
 †Carydium globularis
 †Carydium varicosa
 †Carydium varicosum
 †Caryocaris
 †Caryocrinites
 †Caryocrinites ornatus
 †Caseoceras
 †Caseoceras obesum – type locality for species
  †Cassinoceras
 †Cassinoceras explanator
 †Cassinoceras grande
 †Cassowarioides
 †Cassowarioides whitei – type locality for species
 †Casteroceras
 †Casteroceras alternatum
 †Catatonocrinus
 †Catatonocrinus halli
 †Catazone
 †Catazone nevadana – or unidentified comparable form
 †Catazyga
 †Catazyga erratica
 †Catoraphiceras
 †Catoraphiceras cushingi
 †Caulopteris
 †Caulopteris lockwoodi
 †Caunopora
 †Centroceras
 †Centroceras marcellense
 †Centrocyrtoceras
 †Centrocyrtoceras mozolai
 †Centronella
 †Centronella gilboa
 †Centronella glansfagea
 †Centronella impressa
 †Centronella lisbonensis
 †Centrotarphyceras
 †Centrotarphyceras imperator
 †Centrotarphyceras seelyi
 †Ceramopora
 †Ceramopora imbricata
 †Ceramopora imbriccata
 †Ceramopora incrustans
 †Ceramopora incrustus
 †Ceramoporella
 †Ceratiocaris
 †Ceratocephala
 †Ceratocephala triacantheis
 †Ceratopea
 †Ceratopea canadensis – type locality for species
 †Ceratopea obtusa – type locality for species
 †Ceratopora
 †Ceraurinella
 †Ceraurinella latipyga – type locality for species
  †Ceraurus
 †Ceraurus hudsoni
 †Ceraurus pleurecanthemus
 †Ceraurus pleurexanthemus
 †Ceraurus pleuxanthemus
 †Ceraurus polydorus
 †Ceraurus pompilius
 †Chaetetes
 †Chaetetes lycoperdon
 †Champlainopora
 †Champlainopora chazyensis
  †Chancelloria
 †Chapinella – tentative report
 †Charactocrinus
 †Charactocrinus pustulosus
 †Charionella
 †Charionella ovata
 †Charionella rostrata
 †Charionoides
 †Charionoides doris
 †Chasmatopora
 †Chasmatopora angulata
 †Chasmatopora angulatum
 †Chasmatopora asperatostriata
 †Chasmatopora asperostriata
 †Chazydictya
 †Chazydictya chazyensis
 †Chazyoceras
 †Chazyoceras valcourense
 †Cheiloceras
 †Cheiloceras amblylobum
 †Cheirocrinus
 †Cheirocrinus anatiformis
  †Cheirurus
 †Cheirurus niagarensis
 †Chilobolbina
 †Chilobolbina hartfordensis
 †Chilotrypa
 †Chilotrypa ostiolata
 †Chironiptrum – tentative report
 †Chironiptrum arcuatum – type locality for species
   †Chondrites
 †Chonetes
 †Chonetes cornutus
 †Chonetes deflecta
 †Chonetes ensicosta
 †Chonetes filicostatus
 †Chonetes hemisphericus
 †Chonetes mucronatus
 †Chonetes nectus – or unidentified comparable form
 †Chonetes vicinus
 †Chonophyllum
 †Chonophyllum magnificus
 †Chonostrophia
 †Chonostrophia reversa
 †Chonostrophiella
 †Christiania
 †Christiania trentonensis
 †Chutoceras
 †Chutoceras nundaium
 †Cimitaria
 †Cimitaria corrugata
 †Cimitaria elongata
 †Cimitaria recurva
 †Cincinnaticrinus
 †Cincinnaticrinus multibrachiatus
 †Cincinnaticrinus varibrachialis
  †Cincinnetina
 †Cincinnetina multisecta
  †Cladochonus
 †Cladochonus dichotoma
 †Cladochonus jacksoni
 †Cladopora
 †Cladopora cervicornis
 †Cladopora fibrosa – tentative report
 †Cladopora multipora
 †Cladopora reticulata
 †Cladopora seriata
 †Cladoxylon
 †Cladoxylon dawsoni
 †Cladoxylon hueberi
 †Clarkecrinus
   †Clarkeipterus
 †Clarkeipterus testudineus – type locality for species
 †Clarkoceras
 †Clarkoceras rhomboidale
 †Clarkoceras ruedemanni
 †Clarkoceras trapezoidale
 †Clathrodictyon
 †Clathropora
 †Clathropora alcicornis
 †Clathropora frondosa
 †Clathrospira
 †Clathrospira euconica
 †Clathrospira subconica
 †Cleionychia
 †Cleionychia marginalis
 †Cleionychia montrealensis
 †Cleionychia undata
 †Clelandia
 †Clelandia parabola
 †Clidochirus
 †Clidochirus schucherti
 †Clidophorus
 †Clidophorus obscurus
 †Clidophorus planulatus
  †Climacograptus
 †Climacograptus typicalis
 †Clintonella
 †Clintonella vagabunda – or unidentified comparable form
 †Clionlithes
 †Clionolithes
 †Clitambonites
 †Clitambonites multicosta
 †Clitendoceras
 †Clitendoceras montrealense
 †Clitendoceras saylesi
 †Clorinda
 †Clorinda fornicata
 †Codaster
 †Codaster pyramidatus
 †Coeloclema
 †Coeloclema cavernosum
 †Coelonella
 †Coelonella scapha
 †Coelospira
 †Coelospira camilla
 †Coelospira dichotoma
 †Coelospira hemispherica
 †Coelospira plicatula
 †Coelospira sulcata
 †Coenites
 †Coenostelodictyon
 †Coenostelodictyon jewetti
 †Coenostelodictyon krekovi – or unidentified comparable form
 †Coenostroma
 †Coenostroma monticuliferum – or unidentified comparable form
 †Coleolus
 †Coleolus aciculatum
 †Coleolus camilla
 †Coleolus crenatocinctum
 †Coleolus tenuicinctum
 †Coleolus tenuicinctus
 †Colpodexylon
 †Colpodexylon deatsii
 †Colpodexylon trifurcatum
 †Colpomya
 †Colpomya faba
 †Columnaria
 †Compsocrinus
 †Compsocrinus relictus
 †Conchopeltis
 †Conchopeltis alternata
 †Conocardium
 †Conocardium denticulatum – type locality for species
 †Conocephalina
 †Conocephalina whitehallensis – type locality for species
 †Conocerina
 †Conocerina reducta
 †Conostichnus
 †Conotheca
 †Conotheca australiensis – type locality for species
 †Conotreta
 †Conotreta rusti – type locality for species
 †Conularia
 †Conularia longa
 †Conularia niagarensis
 †Conularia trentonensis
 †Conularia triangularis
 †Conularia triangulata
 †Conularia undulata
 †Conularid
  †Cooksonia
 †Cooksonia hemisphaerica – or unidentified comparable form
 †Coolinia
 †Coolinia subplana
 †Coolinia tnuis
 †Cordatomyonia
 †Cordatomyonia shupei
 †Cordylocrinus
 †Cordylocrinus plumosus
 †Cordylocrinus ramulosus
 †Cordylodus
 †Cordylodus angulatus
 †Cordylodus caseyi
 †Cordylodus proavus
 †Cornellites
 †Cornellites chemungensis
 †Cornellites emaceratum
 †Cornellites emaceratus
 †Cornellites fasciculata
 †Cornellites flabella
 †Cornellites flabellum
 †Cornellites flubella
  †Cornulites
 †Cornulites bellistriatus
 †Cornulites distans
 †Cornulites flexuosus
 †Cornulites niagarensis
 †Cornuproetus
 †Cornuproetus beecheri
 †Coronocrinus
 †Coronocrinus polydactylus
 †Corynexochides – tentative report
 †Corynoides
 †Corynotrypa
 †Corynotrypa dissimilis
 †Costalocrinus
 †Costalocrinus rex – type locality for species
 †Costalocrinus sentosus
 †Costellirorstra
 †Costellirorstra peculiaris – or unidentified comparable form
 †Costellirostra
 †Costellispirifer
 †Costispirifer
 †Costispirifer arenosa – or unidentified comparable form
 †Costispirifer arenosus
 †Costistricklandia
 †Costistricklandia gaspeensis
 †Costistricklandia lirata
 †Costulatostyliolina
 †Cotteroceras
 †Cranaena
 †Cranaena eudora
 †Cranaena lincklaeni
 †Cranaena linklaen
 †Cranaena linklaeni
 †Cranaena navicella
 †Cranaena romingeri
 †Cranaena subalobosa
 Crania
 †Crania crenistriata
  Craniella
 †Craniella hamiltoniae
 †Craniops
 †Craniops hamiltoniae
 †Craniops linguiformis
 †Craniops squammiformis
 †Crassotornoceras
 †Crassotornoceras crassum – or unidentified related form
 †Crenistriella
 †Crenistriella crenistria
 †Crenistriella rotalinea
 †Crickites
 †Crickites lindneri
 †Crinobrachiatus
 †Crinobrachiatus brachiatus
 †Crinoid
 †Crinoid anchors
 †Cristodus
 †Cristodus loxoides
 †Crownopora
 †Crurispina
 †Crurispina nana
 †Crurispina spinosa
 †Cryptograptus
 †Cryptolithus
 †Cryptolithus bellulus
 †Cryptolithus lorettensis
 †Cryptolithus tesselatus
 †Cryptonella
 †Cryptonella planirostra
 †Cryptonella planirostrata
 †Cryptonella rectirostra
 †Cryptonella rectirostrata
 †Cryptophyllus
 †Cryptophyllus arsinius – type locality for species
 †Ctenacaronychus – type locality for genus
 †Ctenacaronychus nortoni – type locality for species
 †Ctenocrinus
 †Ctenocrinus nobilissimus
 †Ctenocrinus pachydactylus
 †Ctenocrinus stoloniferus
 †Ctenodonta
 †Ctenodonta bidorsata
 †Ctenodonta dubia
 †Ctenodonta dubiaformis
 †Ctenodonta elliptica
 †Ctenodonta lata
 †Ctenodonta limbata
 †Ctenodonta machaeriformis
 †Ctenodonta mactriformis
 †Ctenodonta peracuta
 †Ctenodonta salinensis
 †Ctenoloculina
 †Ctenoloculina cicatricosa
 †Ctenoloculina eurybathrota
   †Ctenopterus
 †Ctenopterus cestrotus
 †Cuneamya
 †Cuneamya alveata
 †Cuneamya cuneata
 †Cuneamya elliptica
 †Cupularostrum
 †Cupularostrum congregata
 †Cupularostrum contracta
 †Cupularostrum dotis
 †Cupularostrum exima
 †Cupularostrum eximia
 †Cupularostrum horsfordi
 †Cupularostrum orbicularis – tentative report
 †Cupularostrum prolifica
 †Cupularostrum stevensi
 †Cupulocorona
 †Cupulocorona gemmiformis
 †Cupulocrinus
 †Cupulocrinus gracilus
 †Cupulorostrum
 †Cupulorostrum congregata
 †Cupulorostrum dotis
 †Cupulorostrum horsfordi
 †Cupulorostrum prolifica
 †Cupulorostrum sappho
 †Curtoceras
 †Curtoceras eatoni
 †Curtoceras internistriatum
 †Cyathocylindrium
 †Cyathodictya – tentative report
 †Cyathophyllum
 †Cybele
 †Cybele prima
 †Cybele primus
 †Cybeloides
 †Cybeloides prima
 †Cyclonema
 †Cyclonema cancellatum
 †Cyclonema leptonotum
 †Cyclonema varicasum
 †Cyclonema varicosum
 †Cyclora
 †Cyclora subulata
 †Cyclostomiceras
 †Cyclostomiceras cassinense
 †Cylindrophyllum
 †Cymatonota
 †Cymatonota raricosta
 †Cymatonota undatum
 †Cymostrophia
 †Cymostrophia patersoni
   †Cyphaspis
 †Cypricardella
 †Cypricardella bellastriata
 †Cypricardella bellistriata
 †Cypricardella complana
 †Cypricardella complanata
 †Cypricardella complanatus
 †Cypricardella crassa
 †Cypricardella gregaria
 †Cypricardella laroquei
 †Cypricardella marylandica
 †Cypricardella tenuistriata
 †Cypricardella tenuistriatus
 †Cypricardina
 †Cypricardinea
 †Cypricardinea indenta
 †Cypricardinia
 †Cypricardinia indenta
 †Cypricardinia undulostriata
 †Cypricordella
 †Cypricordella tenuistriata
 †Cyrtactinoceras
 †Cyrtactinoceras boycii
 †Cyrtactinoceras champlainense
 †Cyrtia
 †Cyrtia exporrecta
 †Cyrtia meta
 †Cyrtia pyramidalis
 †Cyrtina
 †Cyrtina dalmani – or unidentified comparable form
 †Cyrtina hamiltonensis
 †Cyrtina hamiltoniae
 †Cyrtina pyramidalis
 †Cyrtina recta
 †Cyrtina rostrata
 †Cyrtina varia – or unidentified comparable form
 †Cyrtinoides
 †Cyrtinoides eliei
 †Cyrtobaltoceras
 †Cyrtobaltoceras gracile
  †Cyrtoceras
 †Cyrtoceras eugenium
 †Cyrtoceras kirkbyi – tentative report
 †Cyrtoceras subcancellatum
 †Cyrtodonta
 †Cyrtodonta alata
 †Cyrtodonta scala
 †Cyrtodonta solitaria
 †Cyrtodontula
 †Cyrtodontula ventricosa
 †Cyrtolites
 †Cyrtolites ornatus
 †Cyrtolites pileolus
 †Cyrtolites type locality for species – informal
 †Cyrtonella
 †Cyrtonella mitella
 †Cyrtorizoceras
 †Cyrtorizoceras rusti – type locality for species
 †Cyrtospira
 †Cyrtospira raymondi
  †Cyrtospirifer
 †Cyrtospirifer alti
 †Cyrtospirifer altiplicatus
 †Cyrtospirifer augusticardinalis
 †Cyrtospirifer chemungensis
 †Cyrtospirifer cyrtiniformis
 †Cyrtospirifer disjunctus
 †Cyrtospirifer hornellensis
 †Cyrtospirifer inermis
 †Cyrtospirifer nucalis
 †Cyrtospirifer preshoensis
 †Cyrtospirifer sulcifer
 †Cyrtospirifer vandermarkensis
 †Cyrtospirifer whitneyi
 †Cyrtostropha – type locality for genus
 †Cyrtostropha macrospira
 †Cyrtovaginoceras
 †Cystiphylloides
 †Cystiphylloides americanum
 †Cystiphylloides confollis
 †Cystiphylloides conifolis
 †Cystiphylloides conifollis
 †Cystiphylloides sulcatum
 †Cystiphyllum
 †Cystiphyllum niagarense
 †Cystophylloides
 †Cytarocrinus
 †Cyttarocrinus
 †Cyttarocrinus eriensis

D

 †Dactylogonia
 †Dactylogonia incrassata
  †Dadoxylon
 †Dadoxylon halli – or unidentified comparable form
 †Dakeoceras
 †Dakeoceras champlainense – type locality for species
 †Dakeoceras gracilis
 †Dakeoceras harrisi – type locality for species
 †Dalejina
 †Dalejina hybrida
 †Dalejina oblata – tentative report
 †Dalmanella
 †Dalmanella elegantula
 †Dalmanella elgantula
 †Dalmanella rogata
 †Dalmanella whittakeri
   †Dalmanites
 †Dalmanites limulurus
 †Dalmanites litchfieldensis
 †Dalmanitina
  †Daonella
 †Dapsilodus
 †Dapsilodus mutatus
 †Dawsonoceras
 †Dawsonoceras americanum
 †Dawsonoceras americanus
 †Dawsonoceras annulatum
  †Decadocrinus
 †Decadocrinus multinodosus
 †Decadocrinus ornatus
 †Dechenella
 †Dechenella macrocephalus
 †Dechenella rowi
 †Decoriconus
 †Decoriconus fragilis
  †Deiphon
 †Dekayia
 †Delphiceras
 †Delphiceras cataphractum
 †Deltacrinus
 †Deltacrinus clarus
 †Deltacrinus contractus
 †Delthyris
 †Deltoceras
 †Deltoceras vaningeri
 †Denayella
 †Denayella rotalia
 †Dendrocrinus
 †Dendrocrinus alternatus
 †Dendrocrinus aphelos
 †Dendrocrinus bactronodosus
 †Dendrocrinus longidactylus
 †Dendrocrinus ursae
 †Dendrocystites
 †Dendrocystites paradoxocus
 †Densastroma
 †Densastroma pexisum
 †Depasophyllum
 †Depasophyllum tabulatum – type locality for species
 †Desmograptus
 †Devonacarus – type locality for genus
 †Devonacarus sellnicki – type locality for species
 †Devonaster
 †Devonoblastus
 †Devonoblastus leda
 †Devonochonetes
 †Devonochonetes coronatus
 †Devonochonetes scitulus
 †Diabolirhynchia
 †Diabolirhynchia acinus – or unidentified comparable form
 †Diabolirhynchus
 †Diabolirhynchus acinus
 †Diacanthaspis
 †Diacanthaspis parvula
 †Diamesopora
 †Diamesopora dichotoma
 †Diamesropora
 †Diamesropora dichotoma
 †Diaphelasma
 †Diaphelasma oklahomense – or unidentified comparable form
 †Diaphorastoma
 †Diaphorodus
 †Diaphorodus delicatus
 †Dibolbina
 †Dibolisporites
 †Dibolisporites correctus – or unidentified comparable form
 †Dicellograptus
 †Dicoelosia
 †Dicoelosia biloba
 †Dicranella
 †Dicranella bivertex
 †Dicranograptus
 †Dicranograptus nicholsoni
 †Dicranopeltis
 †Dicranopltus
 †Dicranopltus nereus – or unidentified comparable form
 †Dictyobembix
 †Dictyobembix hebe – type locality for species
 †Dictyonema
 †Dictyonema gracile
 †Dictyonema gracilis
 †Dictyonema hamiltoniae
 †Dictyonema retiforme
 †Dictyonema subretiforme
 †Dictyotomaria
 †Dictyotomaria capillaria
 †Dictyotomaria itylus – type locality for species
  †Didymograptus
 †Diestoceras
 †Diestoceras sycon – type locality for species
 †Dignomia
 †Dignomia alveata
  †Dikelocephalus
 †Dikelocephalus hartti
 †Dikelocephalus tribulus – type locality for species
 †Dimerocrinites
 †Dimerocrinites arborescens
 †Dimerocrinites lilliformis
 †Dimerocrinites lockportensis
 †Dimerocrinus
 †Dimerocrinus brachiatus
 †Dimerocrinus liliiformis
 †Dimeropyge
 †Dimeropyge clintonensis
 †Dinorthis
  †Dipleura
 †Dipleura dekayi
 †Diploclema
 †Diploclema sparsum
  †Diplograptus
 †Diplophyllum
 †Diplophyllum subcaespitosum
 Discina
 †Discina doria
 †Discina minuta
 †Discinella
 †Discinella micans
 †Discinocaris
 †Discomyorthis
 †Discomyorthis musculosa
 †Discosorus
 †Discosorus conoideus
 †Disphyllum
 †Disphyllum caespitosum
 †Distacodus
 †Distacodus falcatus
 †Distomodus
 †Distomodus staurognathoides
 †Dizygopleura
 †Dizygopleura intermedia
 †Dizygopleura proutyi
 †Dizygopleurella
 †Dolatocrinus
 †Dolatocrinus lirata
 †Dolatocrinus liratus
 †Dolatocrinus springeri – type locality for species
 †Doleroides
 †Dolerorthis
 †Dolerorthis flabella
 †Dolerorthis flabellites – or unidentified related form
 †Dolichoharpes
   †Dolichopterus
 †Dolichopterus herkimerensis – type locality for species
 †Dolichopterus jewetti – type locality for species
 †Dolichopterus macocheirus
 †Dolichopterus siluriceps
 †Doraclatum
 †Doraclatum compandium – type locality for species
 †Douvillina
 †Douvillina cayuta
 †Douvillina inaequistriata
 †Douvillina inequistriata
 †Douvillina ineuistriata
 †Douvillina inquistriata
 †Dracochela – type locality for genus
 †Dracochela deprehendor – type locality for species
 †Drepanellina
 †Drepanellina modesta
 †Drepanoistodus
 †Drepanoistodus concavus
 †Drepanoistodus suberectus
  †Drepanophycus
 †Drepanophycus colophyllus
 †Drepanophycus gaspianus
 †Drepanophycus spinaeformis
 †Drepanophycus spinosus
 †Drydenia
 †Drydenia foliata
 †Dwightoceras
 †Dwightoceras dactyloides
 †Dynamocrinus
 †Dynamocrinus robustus
 †Dyoidophragma
 †Dyoidophragma polymorphum

E

 †Eatonia
 †Eatonia medalis
 †Eatonia medialis
 †Ecchosis – type locality for genus
 †Ecchosis pulchribothrium – type locality for species
 †Ecculiomphalus
 †Ecculiomphalus fredericus
 †Eccyliopterus
 †Eccyliopterus kalmi
 †Eccyliopterus vagrans
 †Ecdyceras
 †Ecdyceras sinuiferum
 †Echinocaris
 †Echinocoelia
 †Echinocoelia ambocoelioides
 †Echinocoelia ambocoeloides
 †Echinolichas
 †Echinolichas eriopus
 †Ectenoceras
 †Ectenocrinus
 †Ectenocrinus simplex
 †Ectenocrinus triangulus
 †Ectenodesma
 †Ectenolites
 †Ectenolites clelandi
 †Ectenolites curviseptatus
 †Ectenolites extensus
 †Ectenolites sinuatus
 †Ectocycloceras
 †Ectocycloceras cataline
 †Ectocycloceras cato
 †Edaphophyllum
 †Eddya
 †Eddya sullivanensis
 †Edmondia (bivalve) – tentative report
 †Edmondia philipi
 †Edriocrinus
 †Edriocrinus occidentalis
 †Edriocrinus pociliformis
 †Elasmonema
 †Elasmonema lichas
  †Eldredgeops
 †Eldredgeops rana
 †Eleutherocrinus
 †Elita
 †Elita fimbriata
 †Elita fimoriata
 †Ellesmeroceras
 †Ellesmeroceras inbricatum
 †Ellesmeroceras indomitum
 †Elliptocephala
 †Elliptocephala asaphoides
 †Elyta
 †Elyta fimbriata
 †Emanuella
 †Emanuella subumbona
 †Emmanuella
 †Emmanuella subumbona
 †Emmelezoe
 †Emmelozoe
 †Emmonsia
 †Emphanisporites – tentative report
 †Enallophrentis – tentative report
 †Encrinaster
  †Encrinurus
 †Encrinurus ornatus
  †Endoceras
 †Endoceras annuliferum
 †Endoceras champlainense
 †Endoceras hudsoni
 †Endoceras magister
 †Endoceras proteiforme
 †Endoceras raymondi
 †Endoceras tityrus
 †Endodesma
 †Endodesma tranceps
 †Endophyllum
 †Endophyllum ciurcai – type locality for species
 †Enfieldia
 †Enfieldia mutilata
 †Ensiferites
 †Ensiferites armatus
 †Ensiferites bennetti
 †Ensiferites delicatulus
 †Ensiferites leptodactylus
 †Ensiferites wattlesi
 †Enterolasma
 †Enterolasma calculum
 †Enterolasma caliculum
 †Enterolasma strictum
 †Eoagnostus
 †Eoagnostus acrorhachis – type locality for species
 †Eoangyomphalus
 †Eoangyomphalus peneglabra – type locality for species
 †Eoarthropleura – type locality for genus
 †Eobucania
 †Eobucania subovatus – type locality for species
 †Eocoelia
 †Eocoelia hemisphaerica
 †Eocoelia hemispherica
 †Eocoelia intermedia
 †Eocoelia sulcata
 †Eodevonaria
 †Eodevonaria acutiradiata
 †Eodevonaria arcuata
 †Eodevonaria gaspensis – or unidentified comparable form
 †Eodevonaria hemispherica
 †Eodictyonella (formerly Dictyonella)
 †Eodictyonella coralifera
 †Eohalysiocrinus
 †Eohalysiocrinus caelatus
 †Eohalysiocrinus typus
 †Eoleperditia
 †Eomyelodactylus
 †Eomyelodactylus sparteus – type locality for species
 †Eomyelodactylus spartus
 †Eomyelodactylus uniformis – type locality for species
 †Eoplectodonta
 †Eoplectodonta transversalis
 †Eopolychaetus
 †Eorizoceras
 †Eorizoceras platyceroides
 †Eorudolfoceras
 †Eorudolfoceras antiquum
 †Eoschizodus
 †Eoschizodus chemungensis
 †Eoschuchertella
 †Eoschuchertella arcotostriata
  †Eospermatopteris
 †Eospermatopteris erianus – tentative report
 †Eospinatrypa
 †Eospinatrypa nodostriata
 †Eospirifer
 †Eospirifer plicatula – or unidentified comparable form
 †Eospirifer radiatus
 †Eospongia
 †Eospongia varians
 †Eosyringothyris – or unidentified comparable form
 †Eosyringothyris asper
 †Eotripteroceras
 †Eotripteroceras minutum
 †Epitornoceras
 †Epitornoceras mithracoides – or unidentified comparable form
 †Epitornoceras peracutum
 †Erdiotrypa
 †Erdiotrypa striata
 †Eremoceras
 †Eremoceras expansum
 †Eremoceras multicameratum
 †Eremoceras teres
    †Erettopterus
 †Erettopterus globiceps
 †Erettopterus grandis
 †Erettopterus waylandsmithi – type locality for species
 †Eridophyllum
 †Eridophyllum gigas
 †Eridophyllum subcaespitosum
 †Eridotrypa
 †Eridotrypa exigua
 †Eridotrypa mutabilis
 †Eridotrypa nutabilis
 †Eridotrypa solida
 †Eridotrypa striata
 †Eridotrypella
 †Eridotrypella striata – or unidentified comparable form
  †Erieopterus
 †Erieopterus microphthalmus
 †Eroicaspira
 †Eroicaspira bellicincta
 †Erratencrinurus
 †Erratencrinurus vigilans
 †Escharopora
 †Etymothyris
   †Eucalyptocrinites
 †Eucalyptocrinites caelatus
 †Eucalyptocrinus
 †Eucalyptocrinus caelatus
 †Eucheirocrinus
 †Euconia
 †Euconia sinuata – type locality for species
 †Euglyphella
 †Euglyphella asapha – type locality for species
 †Euglyphella deltella – type locality for species
 †Euglyphella numismoides
 †Eukloedenella
 †Eumetabolotoechia
 †Eumetabolotoechia multicostata
 †Eunema
 †Eunoa
  †Euomphalus
 †Euomphalus clymenoides
 †Euomphalus fairchildi – type locality for species
 †Euptychaspis
 †Euptychaspis typicalis
 †Eurychilina
 †Eurychilina canadensis
 †Eurychilina latimarginata
      †Eurypterus
 †Eurypterus dekayi
 †Eurypterus laculatus
 †Eurypterus pittsfordensis
 †Eurypterus remipes
 †Eurystomites
 †Eurystomites accelerans
 †Eurystomites amplectens
 †Eurystomites kelloggi
 †Euryzone
 †Euryzone arata
 †Euryzone clausa
 †Euryzone itys
 †Eusarcus
 †Euspirocrinus
 †Euspirocrinus wolcottense
 †Eutaxocrinus
 †Eutaxocrinus ithacense
 †Eutaxocrinus whiteavesi
 †Exoclitendoceras – type locality for genus
 †Exoclitendoceras rochdalense – type locality for species

F

 †Fahraeusodus
 †Fahraeusodus marathonensis
 †Failleana
 †Failleana limbata
 †Falsipollex
 †Falsipollex simplilobatus – type locality for species
 †Fardenia
 †Fardenia interstriata
   †Favosites
 †Favosites alpenensis
 †Favosites arbuscula
 †Favosites argus
 †Favosites basalticus
 †Favosites biloculi
 †Favosites canadensis
 †Favosites constrictus
 †Favosites emmonsi
 †Favosites epidermatus
 †Favosites favosideus
 †Favosites hamiltoniae
 †Favosites helderbergensis
 †Favosites helderbergiae
 †Favosites hisingeri
 †Favosites limitaris
 †Favosites milne-edswardii
 †Favosites milneedwardsii
 †Favosites niagarensis
 †Favosites nitella – tentative report
 †Favosites parasiticus
 †Favosites placenta
 †Favosites pyriforme
 †Favosites pyriformis
 †Favosites tuberosa
 †Favosites turbinata
 †Favosites turbinatus
 †Fenestella
 †Fenestella elegans
 †Fenestella emaciata
 †Fenestella eumaciata
 †Fenestella planiramosa
 †Fenestella tenuis
 †Fenestrellina
 †Ferestromatopora – report made of unidentified related form or using admittedly obsolete nomenclature
 †Filogranites
 †Filogranites booiji
 †Fimbrispirifer
 †Fimbrispirifer divaricata
 †Fimbrispirifer divaricatus
 †Finkelnburgia
 †Fistulipora
 †Fistulipora crustula
 †Fistulipora laminata
 †Fistulipora sphericus
 †Fistulipora tuberculosa
 †Fistulopora
 †Fistulopora tuberculosa
 †Flabellitesia
 †Flabellitesia flabellites
 †Fletcheria
 †Fletcheria incerta
 †Fletcheria incognita
 †Fletcherina
 †Fletcherina incognita
  †Flexicalymene
 †Flexicalymene senaria
 †Floripatella
 †Floripatella irregularis
 †Floweria
 †Floweria arctostriata
 †Floweria becraftensis
 †Floweria chemungensis
 †Floweria perversa
 †Foersteoceras
 †Foerstephyllum
 †Foerstephyllum halli
 †Foliaster
 †Foliaster transversus
 †Foordites
 †Foordites buttsi – or unidentified comparable form
  †Fordilla
 †Fremontoceras
 †Fremontoceras jewetti
 †Fusispira

G

 †Garwoodia
 †Garwoodia gregaria
 †Gasconadia
 †Gasconadia floridensis – type locality for species
 †Gasconadia mohawkensis – type locality for species
 †Gazacrinus
 †Gazacrinus immaturus
  †Geisonoceras
 †Geisonoceras lineolatus
 †Geisonoceras shumardi
 †Geisonoceras tenuistriatum
 †Geisonoceras tenuitextum
 †Gelasinotarbus – type locality for genus
 †Gelasinotarbus bifidus – type locality for species
 †Gelasinotarbus bonamoae – type locality for species
 †Gelasinotarbus fimbriunguis – type locality for species
 †Gelasinotarbus heptops – type locality for species
 †Gelasinotarbus reticulatus – type locality for species
 †Gennaeocrinus
 †Gennaeocrinus eucharis
  †Gilbertsocrinus
 †Gilbertsocrinus alpenensis
 †Gilbertsocrinus intersculptus – type locality for species
 †Gilbertsocrinus rarispinus – type locality for species
 †Gilbertsocrinus spinigerous
 †Gilbertsocrinus spinigerus
 †Gilboaphyton
 †Gilboaphyton goldringiae
 †Gilboarachne
 †Gilboarachne griersoni – type locality for species
 †Ginkgophyton
 †Glaphurina
 †Glaphurina lamottensis
 †Glaphurus
 †Glaphurus pustulatus
 †Glaphurus pustulotus
 †Glenisteroceras
 †Glenisteroceras obscurum
 †Glossites
 †Glossites depressus
 †Glossites nuculoides
 †Glossograptus
 †Glyptocardia
 †Glyptocardia speciosa
  †Glyptocrinus
 †Glyptocystites
 †Glyptocystites forbesi
 †Glyptodesma
 †Glyptograptus
 †Glyptomena
 †Glyptomena distans
 †Glyptomena prisca
 †Glyptorthis
 †Glyptorthis bellarugosa
 †Glyptorthis crispata
 †Glyptorthis sulcata
 †Glyptotomaria
 †Glyptotomaria ciliata – type locality for species
 †Glyptotomaria genundewa – type locality for species
  †Goldringia
 †Goldringia trivolvis
  †Gomphoceras
 †Gomphocysstites
 †Gomphocysstites tenax – or unidentified comparable form
 †Gonatocaris
 †Gondekia
 †Gondekia lancifer
  †Goniatites
 †Gonioceras
 †Gonioceras anceps
 †Gonioceras brainerdi
 †Gonioceras chaziense
 †Gonioceras multiseptatum
 †Gonioceras pameliense
 †Gonioceras quadratum
 †Goniograptus
 †Goniophora
 †Goniophora chemungensis
 †Goniophora hamiltonensis
 †Goniophora hamiltoniae
 †Goniophora rugosa
 †Goniophora truncata
 †Goniophoria
 †Goniophoria chemungensis
 †Goniostropha
 †Goniostropha extenuata
 †Gosseletia
 †Gosseletia triquetra
 †Gothocrinus – tentative report
 †Gothocrinus multibrachiatus
 †Graciloceras
 †Graciloceras longidomum
 †Gramatodon
 †Gramatodon chemungensis
 †Gramatodon hamiltoniae
 †Grammatodon
 †Grammatodon hamiltoniae
 †Grammysia
 †Grammysia alveata
 †Grammysia arcuata
 †Grammysia bisulcata
 †Grammysia elliptica
 †Grammysia nodocosta
 †Grammysia obsoleta
 †Grammysia praecursor
 †Grammysioidea
 †Grammysioidea alveata
 †Grammysioidea arcuata
 †Grammysioidea constricta
 †Grammysioidea elliptica – or unidentified comparable form
 †Grammysioidea globosa
 †Grammysioidea obsoleta
 †Grammysioidea subarcuata
 †Grammysoidea
 †Grammysoidea arcuata
 †Grammysoidea bisulcata
 †Grammysoidea constricta
 †Graptodictya
 †Graptospongia
  †Greenops
 †Greenops boothi
 †Grinnellaspis
 †Grinnellaspis marginiata – or unidentified comparable form
 †Groomodiscus
 †Groomodiscus calcifer – type locality for species
 †Gypidula
 †Gypidula coeymanensis
 †Gyroceras
 †Gyroceras paucinodum

H

 †Habrostroma
 †Habrostroma centrotum
 †Habrostroma controtum
 †Habrostroma microporum
 †Hadrophyllum
 †Hadrophyllum woodi
 †Hagnocrinus
 †Hagnocrinus corporiculus
 †Haileyia
  †Halkieria
 †Hallinetes
 †Hallinetes lineatus
 †Hallinetes setigera
   †Hallipterus
 †Hallipterus excelsior
 †Halloceras
 †Halloceras undulatum
 †Hallograptus
  †Hallopora
 †Hallopora elegantula
  †Halysites
 †Halysites catenularia
 †Hanaites
 †Hanaites platus
 †Hapsiphyllum
 †Hapsiphyllum bifurcatum
 †Haptocrinus
  †Hardieopterus
 †Hardieopterus myops
 †Haskinsia
 †Haskinsia colophylla
 †Healdia
 †Healdia arkonensis – or unidentified comparable form
 †Hebetoceras
 †Hebetoceras cylindriforme
 †Hebetoceras mirandum
 †Hedeina
 †Hedeina eudora
 †Hedeina macropleura
 †Hedellara
 †Hederella
 †Helcionella
 †Helcionella subrugosa
 †Heliolites
 †Heliolites elegans
 †Heliolites pyriformis
 †Heliolites spinipora – tentative report
 †Heliomeroides
 †Heliomeroides teres
 †Heliophylloides
 †Heliophylloides corniculum
  †Heliophyllum
 †Heliophyllum confluens
 †Heliophyllum gemmatum
 †Heliophyllum halli
 †Helopora
 †Helopora fragilis
 †Helopora ragilis
 †Hemiarges
 †Hemiarges turneri
  †Hemiaspis
 †Hemicystites
 †Hemicystites parasiticus
  †Hemirhodon
 †Hennigopora
 †Hepaticites
 †Hepaticites devonicus
 †Hercostrophia
 †Hercostrophia subcamerata
 †Hercynella
 †Hercynella buffaloensis – or unidentified comparable form
 †Hernodia
 †Herrmannina
 †Herrmannina alta
 †Hertzina
 †Hertzina elongata
 †Hesperorthis
 †Hesperorthis costalis
 †Hesperorthis ignicula
 †Heterocrinus
 †Heterocrinus heterodactylus
 †Heterophrentis
 †Heterophrentis complanata
 †Heterophrentis prolifica
 †Heterophrentis simplex
 †Heteroschisma
 †Heteroschisma canadensis
 †Hexameroceras
 †Hexameroceras chadwicki – tentative report
 †Hibbardia
 †Hibbardia lacrimosa
 †Hibbertia
 †Hibbertia valcourensis
 †Hindella
 †Hindia
 †Hipparionix
 †Hipparionyx
 †Hipparionyx proximus – or unidentified comparable form
 †Hoareicardia
 †Hoareicardia cunea
 †Hollinella
 †Hollinella ampulla – type locality for species
 †Hollinella epakra – type locality for species
 †Hollinella plauta
 †Hollinella retusilobata – type locality for species
 †Hollinella sella – type locality for species
 †Hollinella tricollina
 †Holocystites – tentative report
  †Holopea
 †Holopea obsoleta
 †Holopea plauta
 †Holopea plautus
 †Holopea scrutator
  †Homalonotus
 †Homalonotus delphinocephalus
 †Homalonotus dlephinocephalus
 †Homalophyllum
 †Homalophyllum exigum
 †Homeospira
 †Homeospira apriniformis
 †Homocrinus
 †Homocrinus parvus
 †Homocystites
 †Homocystites anatiformis
 †Homoeospira
 †Homoeospira apriniformis
 †Homotrypa
 †Homotrypa similis
 †Hormotoma
 †Hormotoma bilineata – type locality for species
 †Hormotoma gracilis
 †Hormotoma micula
 †Hormotoma simplex
 †Hormotoma sulcatum
 †Hostinella
 †Hostinella silurica
 †Howellella
 †Howellella crispa
 †Howellella cycloptera – or unidentified comparable form
 †Howellella cyclopterus
 †Howellella vanuxemi
 †Hudsonoceras
 †Hudsonoceras aristos
   †Hughmilleria
 †Hughmilleria shawangunk
 †Hughmilleria socialis
 †Hungerfordia
 †Hungerfordia dichotoma
 †Hyattidina
 †Hyattidina congesta
 †Hyboaspis
 †Hyboaspis depressa
 †Hyenia
 †Hyenia banksii
 †Hyolithellus
 †Hyolithellus micans
 †Hyolithellus papillatus – type locality for species
  †Hyolithes
 †Hyolithes aclis
 †Hyolithes americanus
 †Hyolithes gibbosus
 †Hypagnostus
 †Hyperoblastus
 †Hyperoblastus goldringae
  †Hypodicranotus
 †Hypodicranotus striatulus
 †Hypothyridina
 †Hypothyridina venestula
 †Hypothyridina venustula
 †Hysterolites
 †Hysterolites perimele
 †Hystricurus
 †Hystricurus conicus – or unidentified comparable form
 †Hystricurus ellipticus

I

 †Ibyka
 †Ibyka amphikoma
 †Ichthyocrinus
 †Ichthyocrinus laevis
 †Icriodella
 †Icriodella superba
 †Icriodus
 †Icriodus alternatus
 †Icthyocrinus
 †Icthyocrinus conoideus
 †Icthyocrinus laevis
 †Icthyocrinus subangulatus
 †Idiospira – tentative report
 †Idiospira longa – type locality for species
 †Illaenoides
  †Illaenus
 †Illaenus incertus
 †Illaenus punctatus
 †Inocaulis
 †Inocaulis aborescens
 †Insolitotheca – type locality for genus
 †Insolitotheca communis
 †Intexodictyon
 †Intexodictyon manliusense – type locality for species
  †Iocrinus
 †Iocrinus subcrassus
 †Iocrinus trentonensis
 †Iridistrophia
 †Iridistrophia radiata – or unidentified comparable form
 †Iridopteris
 †Iridopteris eriensis
 †Ischadites
 †Ischadites planoconvexa
 †Ischadites planoconvexum
 †Ischadites planoconvexus
 †Ischyrodonta
 †Ischyrodonta unionoides
 †Ischyrotoma
 †Isochilina
 †Isochilina labrosa
 †Isograptus
 †Isorthis
 †Isorthis perelegans
 †Isorthis proinqua
 †Isorthis propinqua
 †Isoteloides
 †Isoteloides canalis
 †Isoteloides peri
  †Isotelus
 †Isotelus angusticaudum
 †Isotelus bearsi
 †Isotelus canalis
 †Isotelus gigas
 †Isotelus gingas
 †Isotelus harrisi
 †Isotelus obtusum
 †Isotelus obtusus
 †Isotelus simplex
 †Isotelus walcotti
 †Ithacadictya – type locality for genus
 †Ithacadictya cornelli – type locality for species

J

 †Janusella
 †Jenningsina
 †Jenningsina catenulata
 †Joleaudella
 †Joleaudella catilloides
 †Jonesina
 †Jonesina apoglypha – type locality for species
 †Jordanopora
 †Jordanopora heroensis

K

 †Katabuporhynchus
 †Katabuporhynchus mesacostalis
 †Kawina
 †Kawina chazyensis
 †Keithiella
 †Keraiaceras – tentative report
 †Keraiaceras percostatum
 †Keriaceras – tentative report
 †Keriaceras percostatum
 †Kiaeropterus
 †Kiaeropterus otisius
  †Kionoceras
 †Kionoceras cancellatum
 †Kionoceras erraticum – type locality for species
 †Kionoceras infrequens – type locality for species
 †Kionoceras polyplicatum – type locality for species
 †Kionoceras profundum
 †Kionoceras valcourense – type locality for species
 †Kirkbyella
 †Kirkbyella tora – type locality for species
 †Kirkbyella unicornis
 †Kirkbyella verticalis
 †Kitikamispira
 †Kitikamispira concinna – type locality for species
 †Kitikamispira hamiltoniae
 †Kloedenella
 †Kloedenia
 †Knorria
 †Knorria chemungensis
 †Knoxiella
 †Knoxiella reticulata – type locality for species
 †Kockelella
 †Kockelella ortus
 †Kockelella ranuliformis
 †Kockelella walliseri
 †Koenenia
 †Koenenia emarginata
 †Koenenites
 †Koenenites beckeri – type locality for species
 †Koenenites cooperi
 †Koenenites fasciculatus
 †Koenenites styliophilus – type locality for species
 †Kophinocrinus
 †Kophinocrinus spiniferous
 †Kophinocrinus spiniferus
 †Kozlowskiellina
 †Kozlowskiellina perlamellosa
 †Kyphosocrinus
 †Kyphosocrinus tetreaulti

L

 †Labechia
 †Labechia eatoni
 †Labechia prima – type locality for species
 †Labechia pustulosa – or unidentified comparable form
 †Labechia valcourensis – type locality for species
 †Lambeophyllum
 †Lambeophyllum profundum
 †Lamottoceras
 †Lamottoceras franklini
 †Lamottopora
 †Lamottopora duncanae
 †Lapworthella
 †Lapworthella schodakensis
 †Lasiocrinus
 †Lasiocrinus scoparius
 †Laurentoscandodus
 †Laurentoscandodus triangularis
 †Laurentoscandodus triangulatus
 †Lawrenceoceras
 †Lawrenceoceras breve
 †Lawrenceoceras confertissimum
 †Lecanocrinus
 †Lecanocrinus macropetalus
 †Lecanocrinus magnaradialis
 †Lecanocrinus pusillus – or unidentified comparable form
 †Lecanospira
 †Lecanospira compacta
  †Leclercqia
 †Leclercqia complexa
 †Leidosigillaria – or unidentified comparable form
 †Leioclema
 †Leioclema aspera
 †Leioclema asperum
 †Leioclema confertiporum
 †Leioclema decipiens
 †Leioclema florida
 †Leiocorphyge – tentative report
 †Leiocorphyge lobata – type locality for species
 †Leiocoryphe – tentative report
 †Leiocoryphe lobata
 †Leiopyge
 †Leiorhynchus
 †Leiorhynchus laura
 †Leiorhynchus limitare
 †Leiorhynchus limitaris
 †Leiorhynchus mesacarina
 †Leiorhynchus multicostum
 †Leiorhynchus multiscostum – tentative report
 †Leiorhynchus quadracostata
 †Leiorhynchus quadracostatus
 †Leiorhynchus quadricostatum
 †Leiorhynchus sinuata
 †Leiorhynchus sinuatum
 †Leiorhynchus ventricosum
 †Leperditia
 †Leperditia alta
 †Leperditia canadensis
 †Leperditia fabulites
 †Leperditia limatula
 †Leperditia nana
 †Leperditia scalaris
 †Lepidocoleus
 †Lepidocoleus jamesi
      †Lepidodendron
 †Lepidodendron chemungense
 †Lepidosigillaria
 †Lepidosigillaria whitei
 †Lepocrinites
 †Lepocrinites gebhardi
 †Lepocrinites gebhardii
 †Leptaean
 †Leptaean rhomboidalis – report made of unidentified related form or using admittedly obsolete nomenclature
 †Leptaena
 †Leptaena moniquensis
 †Leptaena ordovicica
 †Leptaena rhomboidalis
 †Leptaenisca
 †Leptobolus
 †Leptobolus insigna
 †Leptobolus insignis
 †Leptochilodiscus
 †Leptocoelia
 †Leptocoelia flabellites
 †Leptodesma
 †Leptodesma bigsbyi
 †Leptodesma billingsi
 †Leptodesma clitus
 †Leptodesma conradi
 †Leptodesma dekayi
 †Leptodesma extenuatum
 †Leptodesma jason
 †Leptodesma laevis
 †Leptodesma lichas
 †Leptodesma mathori
 †Leptodesma mesacostalis
 †Leptodesma mortoni
 †Leptodesma naviforme
 †Leptodesma nitida
 †Leptodesma potens
 †Leptodesma propinquum
 †Leptodesma rafinesqui
 †Leptodesma rhomboidea
 †Leptodesma rhomboideum
 †Leptodesma sayi
 †Leptodesma spinerigum
 †Leptodesma spinigerum
 †Leptodesma striatula
 †Leptodesma striatus
 †Leptodesma subplana
 †Leptodesma torregi
 †Leptodesma waviformes
 †Leptograptus
 †Leptograptus annectans
  †Leptospira
 †Leptospira gibbosa
 †Leptostrophia
 †Leptostrophia beckii
 †Leptostrophia bipartita
 †Leptostrophia planulata
 †Leptotrypella
 †Leptotrypella amplectens
 †Leptotrypella asterica
 †Leptotrypella multitecta
 †Levenea
 †Levenea subcarinata
 †Levenia
 †Levenia lenticularis
  †Levisoceras
 †Liacalymene
 †Lichenalia
 †Lichenalia concentrica
 †Lichenocrinus
 †Lidstroemella
 †Lidstroemella aspidum
 †Limoptera
 †Limoptera macroptera
 †Limuloides – tentative report
 †Linguatornoceras
 †Linguatornoceras linguum – or unidentified related form
 †Linguella
 †Linguella granvillensis – or unidentified comparable form
  †Lingula
 †Lingula allingi – type locality for species
 †Lingula clintoni
 †Lingula complanata
 †Lingula curta
 †Lingula densa
 †Lingula desiderata
 †Lingula lamellata
 †Lingula oblata
 †Lingula procne
 †Lingula punctata
 †Lingula riciniformis
 †Lingula semina
 †Lingula spatulata
 †Lingula vicina
 †Lingulapholis – tentative report
  †Lingulella
 †Lingulella brainerdi
 †Lingulella columba
 †Lingulella granvillensis
 †Lingulella prima
 †Lingulepis
 †Lingulepis acuminata
 †Linnarssonia
 †Linoporella
 †Liocalymene
 †Liocalymene clintonensis
 †Liocalymene clintoni
 †Liocalymene niagarensis
 †Liomphalus
 †Liomphalus disjunctus
 †Liospira
 †Liospira americana
 †Lobobactrites
 †Lobobactrites clavus
 †Lobotornoceras
 †Lobotornoceras hassoni – or unidentified related form
 †Loculipora
 †Loculipora perforata
 †Logocrinus
 †Logocrinus geniculatus
 †Lonchocephalus
 †Lonchocephalus calciferus
   †Lonchodomas
 †Lonchodomas chaziensis
 †Lonchodomas halli
 †Longispina
 †Longispina mucronata
 †Longispina mucronatus
 †Longstaffia
 †Longstaffia pulchra
 †Lophospira
 †Lophospira billingsi
 †Lophospira perangulata
 †Lophospira rectistriata
 †Lophospira ventricosa
 †Loxodus
 †Loxodus bransoni
 †Loxonema
 †Loxonema bertiense – tentative report
 †Loxonema postremum
 †Loxophragma
 †Loxophragma lechrium
 †Loxoplocus
 †Loxoplocus gothlandicus – type locality for species
 †Lucasella – tentative report
 †Lucasella spinulifera
 †Lunulacardium
 †Lunulacardium curtum
 †Lunulacardium marcellense
 †Lunulacardium ornatum
 †Luprisca – type locality for genus
 †Luprisca incuba – type locality for species
 †Lyriocrinus
 †Lyriocrinus dactylus
 †Lyriopecten
 †Lyriopecten orbiculatus
 †Lyrodesma
 †Lyrodesma poststriatum

M

 †Macgeea
 †Macgeea ponderosa – type locality for species
 †Machaeraria
 †Mackinnonia
 †Mackinnonia rostratum – type locality for species
 †Mackinnonia taconica – type locality for species
 †Macluritella
 †Macluritella imperfecta – type locality for species
 †Macluritella multiseptarius – type locality for species
 †Macluritella uniangulata
 †Maclurites
 †Maclurites magnus
 †Macrochilina
 †Macrochilina pygmaea
 †Macrochilina seneca
 †Macrocoelia
 †Macrocoelia champlainensis
 †Macrocoelia ruedemanni
 †Macropleura
 †Macropleura eudora
 †Macropleura macropleura
 †Macrostylocrinus
 †Macrostylocrinus fusibrachiatus
 †Macrostylocrinus granulosus – or unidentified comparable form
 †Macrostylocrinus ornatus
 †Maeneceras
 †Maeneceras acutolaterale – or unidentified related form
 †Malocystites
 †Malocystites emmonsi
 †Malocystites murchisoni
 †Manticeras
  †Manticoceras
 †Manticoceras contractum
 †Manticoceras lamed
 †Manticoceras nodifer
 †Manticoceras sinuosum
 †Mariacrinus – report made of unidentified related form or using admittedly obsolete nomenclature
 †Mariacrinus stoloniferus
 †Marsupiocrinus
 †Marsupiocrinus tentaculatus
 †Mastigobolbina
 †Mastigobolbina clarkei
 †Mastigobolbina decora
 †Mastigobolbina incipiens
 †Mastigobolbina lata
 †Mastigobolbina punctata
 †Mastigobolbina retifera
 †Mastigobolbina trilobata
 †Mastigobolbina trilobatus
 †Mastigobolbina trilobita
 †Mastigobolbina typus
 †Mastigobolbina vanuxemi
 †Mastigograptus
 †Matherella – type locality for genus
 †Matherella saratogensis
  †Matthevia
 †Mccluskiceras – type locality for genus
 †Mccluskiceras comstockense – type locality for species
 †Mclearnites
 †Mcqueenoceras
 †Mcqueenoceras jeffersonense – or unidentified related form
 †Meadowtownella
 †Meadowtownella trentonensis
 †Mediospirifer
 †Mediospirifer angustus
 †Mediospirifer audaculus
 †Mediospirifer mucronatus
 †Medusaegraptus
 †Medusaegraptus graminiformis
 †Medusagraptus
 †Megakozlowkiella
 †Megakozlowkiella sculptilis
 †Megakozlowskiella
 †Megakozlowskiella perlamellosa – or unidentified comparable form
 †Megakozlowskiella raricosta
 †Megakozlowskiella sculptilis
 †Megakozlowskiella sculptis
 †Megambonia
 †Megambonia aviculoidea
 †Meganterella
 †Meganterella finksi
 †Megastrophia
 †Megastrophia concava
 †Megastrophia hemisphaerica
 †Megastrophia hemispherica
 †Megastrophia hemisphericus
 †Megastrophia profunda
 †Megastylia
 †Megistocrinus
 †Megistocrinus depressus
 †Mellopegma – tentative report
 †Mellopegma georginensis – tentative report
 †Melocrinus
 †Melocrinus ornatus – type locality for species
 †Mendacella
 †Meniscoceras
 †Meniscoceras coronense
 †Menoeidina
 †Menoeidina multipuncata – type locality for species
 †Menoeidina versicula – type locality for species
  †Meristella
 †Meristella arcuata
 †Meristella barissi
 †Meristella barrisi
 †Meristella doris
 †Meristella haskinsi
 †Meristella laevis
 †Meristella nasuta
 †Meristella praenuntia
 †Meristella princeps
 †Meristella scitula
 †Meristina
 †Meristina nasuta
 †Merocrinus
 †Merocrinus corroboratus
 †Merocrinus typus
 †Mesocoelia
 †Mesocoelia gregaria – or unidentified comparable form
 †Mesodouvillina
 †Mesodouvillina varistriata
 †Mesoleptosrophia
 †Mesoleptosrophia junia
 †Mesoleptostrophia
 †Mesoleptostrophia junia
 †Mesopalaeaster – tentative report
 †Mesopalaeaster lanceolatus
 †Mesotrypa
 †Mesotrypa numiformis
 †Mesotrypa nummiformis
 †Metabaltoceras – type locality for genus
 †Metabaltoceras fusiforme – type locality for species
 †Metaconularia
 †Metaplasia
 †Metaplasia minuta
 †Metriophyllum
 †Michelia
 †Michelia whiteavesi – type locality for species
 †Michelinia
 †Michelinia stylopora
 †Michelinoceras
 †Michelinoceras aldenense
 †Michelinoceras rigidum
 †Microchilina
 †Microcyclus
 †Microdisca
 †Micromitra
 †Mictophyllum
 †Mictophyllum orientalis – type locality for species
 †Millardicurus
 †Mimella
 †Mimella borealis
 †Mimella vulgaris
 †Mirabiloceras
 †Mirabiloceras multitubulatum
 †Missisquoia
 †Missisquoia typicalis
 †Mitroceras
   †Mixopterus
 †Mixopterus multispinosus
 †Modiella
 †Modiella pygmaea
 †Modiodesma
 †Modiodesma modiolare
 †Modiolopsis
 †Modiolopsis anodontoides
 †Modiolopsis exanimis
 †Modiolopsis fabaformis
 †Modiolopsis modiolaris
 †Modiolopsis orthoconcavus – type locality for species
 †Modiolopsis ovata
 †Modiolopsis subalata
 †Modiolopsis subalatus
 †Modiolopsis subcarinata
 †Modiolopsis subcarinatus
 †Modiomorpha
 †Modiomorpha chemungensis
 †Modiomorpha concentrica
 †Modiomorpha mutiloides
 †Modiomorpha mytiloides
 †Modiomorpha pygmaea
 †Modiomorpha quadrula
 †Modiomorpha subalata
 †Modiomorphia
 †Modiomorphia alta
 †Modiomorphia concentrica
 †Modiomorphia mytiloides
 †Monoceratina
 †Monoceratina casei
 †Monodechenella
 †Monodechenella macrocephala
 †Monodechenella macrocephalus
  †Monograptus
 †Monograptus clintonensis
 †Monotrypa
 †Monotrypa benjamini
 †Monotrypa osgoodensis – or unidentified comparable form
 †Monotrypella
 †Monotrypella abrupta – tentative report
 †Monotrypella arbuscula – tentative report
 †Montyoceras
 †Montyoceras arcuatum
 †Montyoceras curviseptatum
 †Montyoceras titaniforme
 †Moorea
 †Morania
 †Mourlonia
 †Mourlonia filitexta
 †Mourlonia plena
 †Mourlonia rugulata
 †Mourlonia subzona – type locality for species
 †Mucopraeca
 †Mucopraeca multicostata – type locality for species
    †Mucrospirifer
 †Mucrospirifer consobrinus
 †Mucrospirifer mucronata
 †Mucrospirifer mucronatus
 †Mucrospirifer tulliensis
 †Mucrospirifier
 †Mucrospirifier mucronatus
 †Mucrspirifer
 †Mucrspirifer mucronatus
 †Mulceodens
 †Mulceodens eboraceus – type locality for species
 †Multicostella
 †Multicostella platys
 †Murchisonia
 †Murchisonia micula
 †Murchisonia subulata
 †Muscrospirifer
 †Muscrospirifer mucronatus
 †Myalina – tentative report
 †Myalina newelli
 †Myelodactylus
 †Myelodactylus convolutus
 †Myelodactylus linae
 †Mytilarca
 †Mytilarca mytiliformis
 †Mytilarca oviformis
 †Mytilops
 †Mytilops praecedens

N

 †Nanahughmilleria
 †Nanahughmilleria clarkei
 †Nanahughmilleria prominens
 †Nanillaenus
 †Nanillaenus americanus
 †Nanno
 †Nanno noveboracum
 †Nanothyris
 †Nanothyris subglobosa – or unidentified comparable form
 †Naplesites
 †Naplesites naplesense
 †Naticonema
  †Naticopsis
 †Navispira – tentative report
 †Nemagraptus
 †Nematopora
 †Nematopora ovalis
 †Nematopora raripora
 †Neoaxon
 †Neokloedenella
 †Neozaphrentis
 †Nephriticeras
 †Nephriticeras metula
 †Nervostrophia
 †Nervostrophia nervosa
 †Nervostrophia plana
 †Nervostrophia tulliensis
 †Newportopora
 †Newportopora typicalis
 †Niagaracrinus
 †Niagaracrinus kopfi
 †Nicholsonella
 †Nicholsonella florida
 †Nieszkowskia – tentative report
 †Nieszkowskia satyrus
 †Nileoides
 †Nileoides perkinsi
 †Niobe
  †Noeggerathia
 †Noeggerathia gilboensis
 †Nowakia
 †Nowakia otomari
 †Nucleocrinus
 †Nucleospira
 †Nucleospira concinna
 †Nucleospira pisiformis
 †Nucleospira ventricosa
 †Nucleospira ventricosta
   Nucula
 Nuculana
 †Nucularca
 †Nucularca lorrainensis
 †Nucularca pectunculoides
 †Nuculites
 †Nuculites lamellata
 †Nuculites nyassa
 †Nuculites nyssa
 †Nuculites oblongatus
 †Nuculites scitulus
 †Nuculites triqueter
 †Nuculites triquiter
  †Nuculoidea
 †Nuculoidea corbuliformis
 †Nuculoidea deceptriformis – type locality for species
 †Nuculoidea lirata
 †Nyassa
 †Nyassa arguata
 †Nyassa arguta
 †Nyassa dorsata
 †Nybyoceras
 †Nybyoceras cryptum
 †Nylanderina
 †Nylanderina goldringae

O

  †Obolella
 †Obolus
 †Octonaria
 †Octonaria bifurcata – type locality for species
 †Odontocephalus
 †Odontocephalus selenurus
   †Odontochile
 †Odontochile micrurus
  †Odontopleura
 †Oepikina
 †Oepikodus
 †Oepikodus communis
 †Oistodus
 †Oistodus eutyphus
 †Oistodus venustus
    †Olenellus
   †Olenoides
 †Omospira
 †Omospira trentonensis
 †Oncoceras
 †Oncoceras constrictum
 †Oncoceras pristinum
 †Oncoceras subrectum
 †Oneotodus – report made of unidentified related form or using admittedly obsolete nomenclature
 †Oneotodus cavus
 †Onoceras
 †Ontaria
 †Onychoplecia
 †Onychoplecia longirostris
 †Oonoceras
 †Oonoceras perkinsi
 †Oonoceras seelyi
 †Ophileta
 †Ophileta discus – type locality for species
 †Opsiconidion
 †Opsiconidion praecursor – or unidentified comparable form
 †Orbiculoidea
 †Orbiculoidea lodensis
 †Orbiculoidea lodiensis
 †Orbiculoidea molina
 †Orbiculoidea newberryi
 †Orbiculoidea tenuistriata
 †Orbiculoidea truncata
 †Orbiculoidea vanuxemi – or unidentified comparable form
 †Orbignyella
 †Ordogeisonoceras
 †Ordogeisonoceras amplicameratum
 †Ormoceras
 †Ormoceras centrale – type locality for species
 †Ormoceras champlainense – type locality for species
 †Ormoceras schohariae – type locality for species
 †Orthambonites
 †Orthambonites acutiplicatus
 †Orthambonites exfoliata
 †Orthidium
 †Orthidium lamellosa
 †Orthidium lamellosum
 †Orthis
 †Orthis flabellites
 †Orthis lepidus
 †Orthis perveta
 †Orthis praeumbona
 †Orthis punctostriata
 †Orthis tenuidens
  †Orthoceras
 †Orthoceras abruptum
 †Orthoceras aristides
 †Orthoceras bassleri
 †Orthoceras clavatum
 †Orthoceras lativentrum
 †Orthoceras lentum
 †Orthoceras limulurus
 †Orthoceras luxum
 †Orthoceras missisquoi
 †Orthoceras modestum
 †Orthoceras multicameratum
 †Orthoceras progressum
 †Orthoceras rectiannulatum
 †Orthoceras sayi
 †Orthoceras vagum
 †Orthoceras virgulatum
 †Orthodesma
 †Orthodesma curtum
 †Orthodesma pulaskiense
 †Orthograptus
 †Orthograptus pageanus
 †Orthograptus quadrimucronatus
 †Orthograptus rivai
 †Orthograptus ruedemanni
 †Orthonota
 †Orthonota carinata
 †Orthonota parvula
 †Orthonota undulata
 †Orthonychia
 †Orthonychia concavum
 †Orthonychia conicum
 †Orthonychia dentalium
 †Orthospirifer
 †Orthospirifer mesastrialis
 †Orthospirifer mesastrialus
 †Orthospirifer mesatrialis
 †Orthostrophia
 †Orthostrophia fasciata
 †Orthotetes
 †Otarion
 †Otarion spinicaudatum
 †Oulodus
 †Oulodus petila
 †Ovoceras
 †Ozarkina
 †Ozarkodina
 †Ozarkodina confluens
 †Ozarkodina hadra
 †Ozarkodina polinclinata
 †Ozarkodina sagitta

P

 †Pachecdyceras
 †Pachecdyceras murale
 †Pachydicta
 †Pachydicta crassa
 †Pachydictya
 †Pachydictya acuta
 †Pachydictya crassa
 †Pachydictya sheldonensis
 †Pachyphyllum
 †Pachyphyllum crassicostatum
 †Pachyphyllum woodmani
 †Pachystrophia – tentative report
 †Pachystylostroma
 †Pachystylostroma champlainense – type locality for species
 †Pachystylostroma goodsellense
 †Pachystylostroma vallum
  †Paciphacops
 †Paciphacops logani
 †Paedeumias
 †Paeeumias
 †Pagetides
 †Pagetides elagans
 †Pagodia
 †Pagodia seelyi – type locality for species
 †Palaeacmaea
 †Palaeacmaea expansa – type locality for species
 †Palaeacmaea typica
 †Palaeactina
 †Palaeaster
 †Palaeaster niagarensis
 †Palaeocapulus
 †Palaeocapulus acutirostre
 †Palaeocaris – tentative report
 †Palaeocaris cuylerensis – type locality for species
 †Palaeocyclus
 †Palaeocyclus ratuloides
 †Palaeocyclus rotuloides
 †Palaeocystites
 †Palaeocystites tenuiradiatus
 †Palaeodictyota
 †Palaeoglossa
 †Palaeoglossa belli
 †Palaeoglossa perovata
 †Palaeoneilo
 †Palaeoneilo angusta
 †Palaeoneilo augusta
 †Palaeoneilo bisulcata
 †Palaeoneilo brevis
 †Palaeoneilo congregata
 †Palaeoneilo constricta
 †Palaeoneilo contracta
 †Palaeoneilo crassa
 †Palaeoneilo elongata
 †Palaeoneilo emarginata
 †Palaeoneilo fecunda
 †Palaeoneilo filosa
 †Palaeoneilo maxima
 †Palaeoneilo muta
 †Palaeoneilo plana
 †Palaeoneilo rudis
 †Palaeoneilo tenuistriata
   †Palaeophonus
 †Palaeophonus osborni – type locality for species
 †Palaeophycus
 †Palaeophycus striatum
 †Palaeophyllum
 †Palaeophyllum multicaule
 †Palaeopinna
 †Palaeopinna flabellum
 †Palaeosaccus
 †Palaeosolen
 †Palaeosolon
 †Palaeosolon siliqui
 †Palaeozygopleura
 †Palaeozygopleura attenuata
 †Palaeozygopleura delphicola
 †Palaeozygopleura hamiltoniae
 †Palaeozygopleura laxa – type locality for species
 †Palaeozygopleura multiplicata – type locality for species
 †Palaeozygopleura noe – type locality for species
 †Palaeozygopleura sicula
 †Palaeozygopleura styliola – type locality for species
 †Palaeschara
 †Palaeschara incrustans
 †Palaozygopleura
 †Palaozygopleura hamiltoniae
 †Paleoclosterium
 †Paleoclosterium leptum
 †Paleocystites
 †Paleocystites tenuiradiatus
 †Paleodictyota
 †Paleodidymoprium
 †Paleodidymoprium didymum
 †Paleooedogonium
 †Paleooedogonium micrum
 †Paleophycus
 †Paleophycus striatum
 †Paleozygopleura
 †Paleozygopleura delphicola
 †Paleschara
 †Paleschara radiata
 †Palmatolepis
 †Palmatolepis triangularis
 †Panderodus
 †Panderodus panderi – or unidentified comparable form
 †Panderodus unicostatus
 †Panenka
 †Panenka hero
 †Panenka retusa
 †Parabolbina
 †Parabufina
 †Parabufina convexa
 †Parabufina subovalis
   †Paracarcinosoma
 †Paracarcinosoma scorpionis
 †Paracardium
 †Paracardium doris
  †Paraceraurus
 †Paraceraurus ruedemanni
 †Paracolocrinus
 †Paracolocrinus paradoxicus
 †Paraconularia
 †Paracyclas
 †Paracyclas arguta
 †Paracyclas devoniana
 †Paracyclas elliptica
 †Paracyclas lirata
 †Paracyclas rowleyi
 †Paracyclas rugosa
 †Paracyclas tenuis
 †Paradakeoceras
 †Paradakeoceras minor
 †Paradakeoceras planiventrum
 †Paraechmina
 †Paraechmina postica
 †Paraechmina spinosa
 †Paraendoceras
 †Paraendoceras depressum – type locality for species
 †Paraendoceras wappingerense – type locality for species
   †Parahughmilleria
 †Parahughmilleria maria
 †Parallelodon
 †Parallelodon hamiltoniae
 †Parallelopora
 †Parallelostroma
 †Parallelostroma foveolatum
 †Parallelostroma microporum – type locality for species
 †Parapanderodus
 †Parapanderodus striatus
 †Paraparchites
 †Paraparchites asymmetrica – type locality for species
 †Paraplethopeltis
 †Paraplethopeltis carinfera – type locality for species
 †Paraschmidtella
 †Paraschmidtella paralobata
 †Paraserratodontus
 †Paraserratodontus costatus
   †Paraspirifer
 †Paraspirifer acuminatus
 †Parastrophina
 †Parazyga
 †Parazyga hirsuta
 †Parodiceras
 †Parodiceras discoideum
 †Paterula
 †Paucicrura
 †Paucicrura rogata
 †Paupospira
 †Paupospira bowdeni
  †Pelagiella
 †Pelagiella minutissima
 †Pelagiella primaeva
 †Pentagonia
 †Pentagonia unisulcata
 †Pentamerella
 †Pentamerella arata
 †Pentamerella aruta
 †Pentamerella pavilionensis
 †Pentamerella pavillionensis
 †Pentamerella pericosta
 †Pentamerella petoskyensis
  †Pentamerus
 †Pentamerus oblongus
 †Pentamerus ovalis
 †Periechocrinites
  †Periechocrinus
 †Periechocrinus speciosus – or unidentified comparable form
 †Periodon
 †Periodon grandis
 †Periodon primum
 †Perissocrinus – type locality for genus
 †Perissocrinus papillatus – type locality for species
  †Peronopsis
 †Peronopsis evansi – type locality for species
 †Peronopsis primigenea – or unidentified comparable form
 †Perotrilites
 †Perotrilites conatus – or unidentified comparable form
 †Petasotheca – type locality for genus
 †Petasotheca minuta – type locality for species
 †Petigurus
 †Petigurus ellipticus – type locality for species
 †Petrocrania
 †Petrocrania hamiltoniae
 †Petrocrania prona
     †Phacops
 †Phacops cristata
 †Phacops triculcatus
 †Phacops trisulcata
 †Phacops trisulcatus
 †Phaenopora
 †Phaenopora clintoni
 †Phaenopora constellata
 †Phaenopora ensiformis
 †Phaenopora explanata
 †Phakelodus
 †Phakelodus terashimai
 †Phanerotrema
 †Phanerotrema labrosa – type locality for species
 †Pharciceras
 †Pharciceras amplexum
 †Phestia
 †Phestia diversa
 †Phestia rostellata
 †Philhedra
 †Phipidomella
 †Phipidomella vanuxemi
 †Phlyctiscapha
 †Phlyctiscapha subovata
 †Phoenixites
 †Phoenixites concentricus
 †Pholadella
 †Pholadella radiata
 †Pholadella radiatus
 †Pholadomorpha
 †Pholadomorpha pholadiformis
 †Pholidops
 †Pholidops linguloides
 †Pholidops squamiformis
 †Pholidops squammiformis
 †Pholidostrophia
 †Pholidostrophia nacrea
 †Pholidostrophia ovata
 †Phorocephala
 †Phorocephala setoni
 †Phragmoceras
 †Phragmodus
 †Phragmodus undatus
 †Phragmolites
 †Phragmolites compressus
 †Phragmosphaera – type locality for genus
 †Phragmosphaera incisus
 †Phragmosphaera lyra – type locality for species
 †Phragmosphaera natator
 †Phragmosphaera triliratus – or unidentified comparable form
 †Phthonia
 †Phthonia cylindrica
  †Phyllograptus
 †Phylloporina
 †Phylloporina asperatastriata
 †Phylloporina asperatostriata
 †Phylloporina asperostriata
 †Phylloporina incepta
 †Physemataspis
 †Physemataspis insularis
 †Pionoceras
 †Pionoceras pomponium
 †Pionoceras vokesi
 †Pionodema
 †Pisocrinus
 †Pittsfordipterus
 †Pittsfordipterus phelpsae
 †Placentella
 †Placentella elliptica – or unidentified comparable form
 †Placoblastus
 †Placoblastus lucina
  †Plaesiomys
 †Plaesiomys iphigenia
 †Plaesiomys strophomenoides
 †Platillaenus
 †Platillaenus erastusi
   †Platyceras
 †Platyceras angulatum
 †Platyceras argo
 †Platyceras carinatum
 †Platyceras desmatum
 †Platyceras erectum
 †Platyceras gebhardi
 †Platyceras hemisphericum
 †Platyceras lineata
 †Platyceras lineatum
 †Platyceras niagarense
 †Platyceras niagarensis
 †Platyceras rarispinum
 †Platyceras reflexum
 †Platyceras rictum
 †Platyceras turbinata
 †Platyceras unisulcata
 †Platyceras ventricosum
 †Platyceras ventricosus
 †Platyorthis
 †Platyorthis planoconvexa
 †Platyrachella
 †Platyrochella
  †Platystrophia
 †Platystrophia biforata
 †Platystrophia biforatus
 †Platystrophia longicardinalis
 †Platystrophia lynx
 †Platystrophia robusta
 †Playfordites
 †Playfordites tripartitus – or unidentified comparable form
 †Plectambonites
 †Plectatrypa
 †Plectatrypa nodostriata
 †Plectoceras
 †Plectoceras jason
 †Plectoceras jasoni
 †Plectodina
 †Plectodonta
 †Plectonotus
 †Plectonotus boucoti
 †Plectonotus trilobita
 †Plectorthis
 †Plectorthis exfoliata
 †Plectostroma
 †Plectostroma micum
 †Plethobolbina
 †Plethobolbina typicalis
 †Plethopeltis
 †Plethopeltis obtusus
 †Plethorhyncha
 †Plethorhynchia
 †Plethorthis
 †Plethospira
 †Plethospira cassina – type locality for species
  †Pleurodictyum
 †Pleurodictyum americanum
 †Pleurodictyum convexa
 †Pleurodictyum convexum
 †Pleurodictyum cylindricum
 †Pleurodictyum cylindricus
 †Pleurodictyum dividua
 †Pleurodictyum stylopora
 †Pleuronotus
 †Pleuronotus decewi
 †Pleuronotus tioga – type locality for species
 †Pleurorima
 †Pleurorima kayseri – type locality for species
  Pleurotomaria
 †Pleurotomaria apicialis – type locality for species
 †Plicanoplia
 †Plicoplasia
 †Plinthokonion – tentative report
 †Plinthokonion psamminon – type locality for species
 †Pliomerops
 †Pliomerops canadensis
 †Plumalina
 †Podolella
 †Pojetaconcha
 †Pojetaconcha beecheri
 †Pojetaia
 †Pojetaia runnegari
 †Poleumita
 †Poleumita crenulata
 †Poleumita vernonensis – type locality for species
  †Polygnathus
 †Polygyrata
 †Polygyrata hunterensis – type locality for species
 †Polyplacognathus
 †Polyplacognathus ramosa
 †Polyplectella
 †Polyplectella mira
 †Polypora
 †Polypora incepta
 †Ponderodictya
 †Ponderodictya punctulifera
 †Ponticeras
 †Ponticeras perlatum
 †Pontobdellopsis
 †Poteriocrinus
 †Poteriocrinus dignatus
 †Praecardium
 †Praematuratropis – type locality for genus
 †Praematuratropis ovatus – type locality for species
 †Praewaagenoconcha
 †Praewaagenoconcha speciosa
 †Prasopora
 †Prasopora lenticularis
 †Prasopora sardesoni
 †Prasopora similatrix
 †Prasopora simulatrix
 †Primaspis
 †Primaspis crosotus
 †Primaspis trentonensis
 †Primitia
 †Primitiella
 †Primitiella unicornis
 †Primitiopsis
 †Primitiopsis punctulifera
 †Prionothyris
 †Prionothyris diobolaris
 †Prismostylus
 †Prismostylus fibratum
 †Pristeroceras
 †Pristeroceras timidum
 †Probeloceras
 †Probeloceras lutheri
 †Probillingsites
 †Probillingsites inflatus – type locality for species
 †Prochorites
 †Prochorites alveolatus
 †Productella
 †Productella arctirostrata
 †Productella belanskii
 †Productella boydii
 †Productella callawayensis
 †Productella dumosa
 †Productella navicella
 †Productella nevicella
 †Productella perplana
 †Productella rectispina
 †Productella speciosa
 †Productella spinulocosta
 †Proendoceras
  †Proetus
 †Proetus clarus
 †Proetus corycocus
 †Proetus corycoeus
 †Proetus haldemani
 †Proetus stokesi
 †Prolixocrinus
 †Prolixocrinus nodocaudis
 †Promourlonia
 †Promourlonia durhamensis
 †Proplina
 †Proplina cornutaformis
 †Propora
 †Prosaukia
 †Prosaukia spinula
 †Proscorpius – type locality for genus
 †Proscorpius osborni – type locality for species
 †Prosopeionum
 †Prosopeionum plexum – type locality for species
 †Prosseria
 †Prosseria grandis
 †Protaster
 †Protaster stellifer
 †Protaxocrinus
 †Protaxocrinus annellus
 †Proteoceras
 †Proteoceras moniliforme
 †Proteoceras perkinsi
 †Proteokalon
 †Proteokalon petryi
 †Proterocameroceras
 †Proterocameroceras brainerdi
 †Prothyris
 †Prothyris lanceolata
 †Protocalyptraea – type locality for genus
 †Protocalyptraea marshalli – type locality for species
 †Protocalyptraea styliophila – type locality for species
 †Protochthonius – type locality for genus
 †Protochthonius gilboa – type locality for species
 †Protocrisina
 †Protocycloceras
 †Protocycloceras catulus
 †Protocycloceras furtivum
 †Protocycloceras lamarcki
 †Protocycloceras xerxes
 †Protodouvillina
 †Protodouvillina inequistrata
 †Protodouvillina inequistriata
 †Protokionoceras
 †Protolepidodendron
 †Protolepidodendron gilboense
 †Protolepidodendron scharianum
 †Protoleptostrophia
 †Protoleptostrophia concava
 †Protoleptostrophia lirella
 †Protoleptostrophia perplana
 †Protomegastrophia
 †Protopanderodus
 †Protoscolex
 †Protozyga
 †Proturritella
 †Proturritella historicum
 †Protypus
 †Pseudaviculopecten
 †Pseudaviculopecten fasciculatus
 †Pseudaviculopecten princeps
 †Pseudoatrypa
 †Pseudoatrypa devoniana
 †Pseudoatrypa entilformis
 †Pseudoatrypta
 †Pseudoatrypta devoniana – or unidentified comparable form
 †Pseudoblothrophyllum
 †Pseudoblothrophyllum arrectum
 †Pseudoblothrophyllum helderbergicum
 †Pseudoblothrophyllum helderbergium
 †Pseudoblothrophyllum munnsvillium
 †Pseudohornea
 †Pseudohornea diffusa
 †Pseudohornera
 †Pseudohornera diffusa
 †Pseudohydnoceras
 †Pseudohydnoceras erraticum
 †Pseudolingula
 †Pseudolingula rectilateralis
  †Pseudoniscus
 †Pseudooneotodus
 †Pseudooneotodus bicornis
 †Pseudoplagiothyra
 †Pseudoplagiothyra praecursor
 †Pseudosphaerexochus
 †Pseudosphaerexochus approximus
 †Pseudosphaerexochus satyrus
 †Pseudosphaerexochus vulcanus
 †Pseudosporochnus
 †Pseudostictoporella
 †Pseudostylodictyon
 †Pseudostylodictyon lamottense
  †Psilophyton
 †Psilophyton grandis
 †Pteracontiodus
 †Pteracontiodus bransoni
 †Pterina
 †Pterina demissa
 †Pterinea
 †Pterinea emacerata
 †Pterinea insueta
 †Pterinea jordani – or unidentified comparable form
 †Pterinea waylandsmithi – type locality for species
 †Pterinopectan
 †Pterinopectan undosus
 †Pterinopectan vertumnus
 †Pterinopecten
 †Pterinopecten erectus
 †Pterinopecten hermes
 †Pterinopecten suborbicularis
 †Pterinopecten vertumnus
 †Pteriochaenia
 †Pteriochaenia fragilis
 †Pterochaenia
 †Pterochaenia fragilis
 †Pterospathodus
 †Pterospathodus amorphognathoides
 †Pterotheca
 †Pterotheca expansa
    †Pterygotus
 †Pterygotus cobbi
 †Pterygotus juvensis
 †Pterygotus monroensis
 †Ptilodictya
 †Ptilodictya plumea
 †Ptilograptus
 †Ptilonaster
 †Ptilonaster princeps
 †Ptiloporella
 †Ptomatis
 †Ptomatis patulus – type locality for species
 †Ptomatis rudis
  †Ptychagnostus
 †Ptychagnostus elegans
 †Ptychagnostus punctuosus
 †Ptychaspis
 †Ptychaspis speciosus
 †Ptychocrinus
 †Ptychocrinus medinensis
 †Ptychodesma
 †Ptychodesma knappianum
 †Ptychomphalina
 †Ptychomphalina lucina
  †Ptychoparia
 †Ptychoparia matheri – type locality for species
 †Ptychoparia minuta
 †Ptychopteria
 †Ptychopteria chemungensis
 †Ptychopteria elongata
 †Ptychopteria flabella
 †Ptychopteria flabellum
 †Ptychopteria mesacostalis
 †Ptychopteria proto
 †Ptychopteria subdecussata
 †Ptychosphaera
 †Ptychosphaera thalia
 †Pugnoides
 †Pugnoides pugnus
 †Punctomosea
 †Punctomosea cristata
 †Punctoprimitia
 †Punctoprimitia subaequalis
 †Pustulatia
 †Pustulatia pustulosa
 †Pyrenmoeus
 †Pyrenmoeus cuneatus
 †Pyrenomoeus
 †Pyrenomoeus cuneatus
 †Pyrgopostibulla – type locality for genus
 †Pyrgopostibulla belli – type locality for species
 †Pyrocystites
 †Pyronema

Q

 †Quasillites
 †Quasillites angulatus
 †Quasillites subobliquus

R

 †Radnoria
 †Rafinesquina
 †Rafinesquina alternata
 †Rafinesquina deltoidea
 †Rafinesquina mucronata
 †Rafinesquina nasuta
 †Rafinesquina obscura
 †Rafinesquina praecursor
 †Rafinesquina prestonensis
 †Raphistoma
 †Raphistoma stamineum
 †Raphistoma striatum
 †Raphistomina
 †Raphistomina undulata
    †Receptaculites
 †Receptaculites monticulatus – or unidentified related form
 †Redstonia
 †Redstonia knaeckei – type locality for species
 †Reimannia
 †Reimannia aldenense
 †Reimannia aldenese
 †Rellimia
 †Rellimia thomsonii
 †Remopleuridella – tentative report
 †Remopleuridella obtusa
 †Remopleurides
 †Remopleurides canadensis
 †Remopleuridiella – tentative report
 †Remopleuridiella obtusa – type locality for species
 †Rensselaeria
 †Rensselaeria elongata – or unidentified comparable form
 †Rensselaerina – tentative report
 †Reptaria
 †Reptaria stolonifera
 †Resserella
 †Resserella elegantula
 †Reteocrinus
 †Reteocrinus stellaris
 †Reteograptus
 †Reteporina
 †Retichonetes
 †Retichonetes obscurus – or unidentified related form
 †Retichonetes setigerus
 †Reticularia
 †Reticularia bicastata
 †Reticularia bicostata
 †Reticularia biocostata
 †Reticularograptus
 †Reticularograptus retiforme
 †Reticulograptus
 †Reticulograptus retiforme
 †Retiolites
 †Retiolites geinitzianus
 †Retiolites venosus
 †Retispira
 †Retispira leda
 †Retispira otsego – type locality for species
 †Retispira repertus – type locality for species
 †Retusotriletes
 †Retusotriletes goensis
 †Retusotriletes rotundus
 †Rhabdosporites
 †Rhabdosporites langi
 †Rhabdosporites langii
 †Rhabdostropha
 †Rhacophyton
 †Rhacophyton ceratangium
 †Rhinidictya
 †Rhinidictya bryozoan
 †Rhinidictya fenestrata
  †Rhinocarcinosoma
 †Rhinocarcinosoma cicerops
 †Rhinopora
 †Rhinopora tuberculosa
 †Rhinopora verrucosa
 †Rhinopora verrucus
 †Rhipidomella
 †Rhipidomella circulus
 †Rhipidomella cyclas
 †Rhipidomella hybrida
 †Rhipidomella hybridia
 †Rhipidomella leucosia
 †Rhipidomella penelope
 †Rhipidomella trigona
 †Rhipidomella vanuxemi
 †Rhipidomelloides
 †Rhipidomelloides oblata
 †Rhipidothyris
 †Rhipidothyris lepida
 †Rhipidothyris mulitplicata
 †Rhipidothyris plicata
 †Rhodesognathus
 †Rhodesognathus elegans
 †Rhombopora
 †Rhombopora rhombifera
 †Rhombotrypa
 †Rhombotrypa spinulifera
 †Rhymokalon
 †Rhymokalon trichium
  †Rhynchonella
 †Rhynchonella bidens
 †Rhynchonella bidentata
 †Rhynchonella emacerata
 †Rhynchonella formosa
 †Rhynchospirina
 †Rhynchotrema
 †Rhynchotrema increbescens
 †Rhynchotreta
 †Rhynchotreta americana
 †Rhynchotreta robusta
 †Rhynidictya
 †Rhynidictya fenestrata
 †Rhyssochonetes
 †Rhyssochonetes aurora
 †Rhyssochonetes filicostatus
 †Rhytimia
 †Rhytimia buffaloensis – or unidentified comparable form
 †Rhytimya
 †Ribeiria
 †Ribeiria taylori – type locality for species
 †Richina
 †Richina selenicristata – type locality for species
 †Rimouskia
 †Ripidiorhynchus – tentative report
 †Robergiella
 †Robergiella brevilingua – or unidentified comparable form
 †Roemerella
 †Roemerella grandis
 †Romingeria
 †Rominigeria
 †Romnigeria
 †Ropalonaria
 †Rossodus
 †Rossodus manitouensis
 Rostricellula
 †Rostricellula major
 †Rostricellula plena
 †Rostricellula pristina
 †Roundyella – tentative report
 †Roundyella concentrica – type locality for species
 †Rudolfoceras
 †Rudolfoceras cornuoryx
 †Ruedemannia
 †Ruedemannia lirata
 †Ruedemannia trilix
 †Ruedemannipterus
 †Ruedemannipterus stylonuroides
  †Rusophycus
 †Rusophycus biloba
 †Rusophycus pudicum
 †Rusophycus subangulatum

S

 †Saccarchites
 †Saccocrinus
 †Salopina
 †Salopina type locality for species A – informal
 †Sandbergeroceras
 †Sandbergeroceras enfieldense – type locality for species
 †Sandbergeroceras syngonum
 †Sanguinolites
 †Sanguinolites contractus
 †Sanguinolites cuneatus
 †Sanguinolites solenoides
 †Sanguinolites tiogensis
 †Sanguinolites truncatus
 †Sapphicorhynchus
 †Sapphicorhynchus sappho
 †Saratogia
 †Sawdonia
 †Sawdonia ornata
 †Scalites
 †Scalites angulatus
 †Scalpellodus
 †Scalpellodus longipinnatus
 †Scapanocrinus
 †Scapanocrinus muricatus
 †Scaptina
 †Scaptina incuda – type locality for species
 †Scendium
 †Scendium pyramidale
   †Scenella
 †Scenella montrealensis
 †Scenella pretensa
 †Scenella robusta
 †Scenophyllum
 †Scenophyllum conigerum
 †Schindewolfoceras
 †Schindewolfoceras chemungense
 †Schindewolfoceras equicostatum – or unidentified related form
 †Schizambon
 †Schizambon duplicimuratum
 †Schizo (genus)
 †Schizocrania
 †Schizocrania filosa
 †Schizocrinus
 †Schizocrinus nodosus
 †Schizodus
 †Schizodus chemungensis
 †Schizonema
 †Schizopea
 †Schizopea typica – type locality for species
 †Schizophoria
 †Schizophoria impressa
 †Schizophoria mulistriata
 †Schizophoria multistriata
 †Schizophoria striatula
 †Schizophoria tioga
 †Schizophoria tulliensis
 †Schizophoria with
 †Schizopodium
 †Schizopodium mummii
 †Schizotreta
 †Schizotreta tenuilamellata
 †Schmidtella
 †Schmidtella crassimarginata
 †Schuchertella
 †Schuchertella arctostriata
 †Schuchertella arctostriatus
 †Schuchertella elegans
 †Schuchertella interstriata
 †Schuchertella marylandica – or unidentified comparable form
 †Schuchertella pandora
 †Schuchertella parva
 †Schuchertella subplana
 †Schuchertella sulcifer
 †Schuchertella tenuis
 †Schuchertella woolworthanus
 †Schuchetella
 †Schuchetella arctostriatus
 †Scolopodus
 †Scolopodus insculptus
 †Scutellum
 †Scutellum niagarensis
 †Scyphocrinites
 †Seelyoceras
 †Seelyoceras raei
 †Semiacontiodus
 †Semiacontiodus iowensis
 †Semiacontiodus nogamii
 †Semicoscinium
 †Semicoscinium tenuiceps
  Serpula
 †Serpulites
 †Serpulospira
 †Serpulospira eboracensis – type locality for species
 †Serpulospira laxus
  †Serrodiscus
 †Serrulacaulis
 †Serrulacaulis furcatus
 †Serulacaulis
 †Serulacaulis furcatus
 †Shumardia
   †Sigillaria
 †Sigillaria gilboensis
 †Silurovelella – type locality for genus
 †Silurovelella casteri – type locality for species
 †Sinochonetes
 †Sinochonetes lepidus
 †Sinuites
 †Sinuites cancellatus – type locality for species
 †Sinuitina
 †Sinuitina acutilira
 †Sinuitina brevilineatus
 †Sinuopea
 †Sinuopea emminencis – type locality for species
 †Sinuopea parva – type locality for species
 †Siphonophrentis
 †Siphonophrentis gigantea
 †Siphonophretis
 †Siphonophretis variabilis
 †Skenidioides
 †Skenidioides pyramidale
 †Skenidioides pyramidalis
 †Skenidium
 †Skenidium insignis – or unidentified comparable form
 †Skenidium pyramidale
 †Skenidium pyramidalis
    †Slimonia
 †Solenopleura
  †Solenopora
 †Solenopora compacta
 †Sowerbyella
 †Sowerbyella curdvillensis
 †Sowerbyella kayi
 †Sowerbyella senaria
 †Sowerbyella sericea
 †Sowerbyella transversalis
 †Spathella
 †Spathella typica
 †Spatiopora
 †Spatiopora maculata
 †Spatipora
 †Spatipora maculata
  †Sphaerexochus
 †Sphaerexochus parvus
 †Sphaerexochus valcourensis
 †Sphaerocoryphe
 †Sphaerocoryphe goodnovi
 †Sphaerocoryphe robusta
 †Sphaeromanticoceras
 †Sphaeromanticoceras oxy
 †Sphaeromanticoceras rhynchostomum
 †Sphaeromanticoceras rickardi
 †Sphaerospongia
 †Sphaerospongia tessellata – or unidentified related form
 †Sphenophragmus
 †Sphenophragmus nanus
 †Sphenosphaera
 †Sphenosphaera fiscellostriata
 †Sphenotreta
 †Sphenotreta acutirostris
 †Spinatrypa
 †Spinatrypa hystrix
 †Spinatrypa spinosa
 †Spinocespitosus
 †Spinocespitosus parallelus
 †Spinocyrtia
 †Spinocyrtia granulosa
 †Spinocyrtia macbridei
 †Spinocyrtia marcyi
 †Spinocyrtina
 †Spinocyrtina granulosa
 †Spinoplasia
 †Spinoplasia gaspensis – or unidentified comparable form
 †Spinozonotriletes – tentative report
 †Spinozonotriletes naumovii – or unidentified comparable form
 †Spinulicosta
 †Spinulicosta spinulicosta
 †Spinulocosta
 †Spinulocosta spinulocosta
 †Spinyplatyceras
 †Spinyplatyceras dumosum
 †Spinyplatyceras fornicatum
  †Spirifer
 †Spirifer anchiasper
 †Spirifer anchiaspirifer
 †Spirifer aroostookensis
 †Spirifer crispatus
 †Spirifer crispus
 †Spirifer duodenarius
 †Spirifer eudora
 †Spirifer macra
 †Spirifer macrothyris
 †Spirifer macrus
 †Spirifer marcyi
 †Spirifer mesicostalis
 †Spirifer mesistrialis
 †Spirifer niagarensis
 †Spirifer posterus
 †Spirifer raricosta
 †Spirifer repertus
 †Spirifer sculptilis
 †Spirifer subcuspidatus
 †Spirifer sulcata
 †Spirifer sulcatus
 †Spirifer varicosa
 †Spirifer varicosta
 †Spirifer williamsi
 †Spirobis
 †Spirobus
 †Spirodentalium – tentative report
 †Spirophyton
  †Spiroraphe
 †Spiroraphe galtensis
  Spirorbis
 †Spirorbis laxa
 †Spyroceras
 †Spyroceras crotalum
 †Spyroceras geneva
 †Spyroceras nuntium
 †Staurograptus
 †Stegerhynchus
 †Stegerhynchus acinus
 †Stegerhynchus neglectum
 †Stegerhynchus neglectus
 †Stenokoleos
 †Stenokoleos bifidus
 †Stenokoleos holmesii
 †Stenoloron
 †Stenoloron areyi – type locality for species
 †Stenopareia
 †Stenopareia globosus
 †Stenopora
 †Stenopora fibrosa
 †Stenopora patula
 †Stenoscisma
 †Stephanocrinus
 †Stephanocrinus angulatus
 †Stephanocrinus gemmiformis
 †Stereolasma
 †Stereolasma rectum
 †Stereospyroceras
 †Stereospyroceras clintoni
 †Steriolasma
 †Steriolasma rectum
 †Steroolasma
 †Steroolasma rectum
 †Stewartophyllum
 †Stewartophyllum intermittens
 †Stictopora
 †Stictopora blackensis
 †Stictopora fenestrata
 †Stictopora labyrintha
 †Stictopora labyrinthica
 †Stictoporella
 †Stictotrypa
 †Stictotrypa punctipora
 †Stigmatella
 †Stipatocrinus
 Stomatopora
 †Straelenia
 †Straparolis
 †Straparollina
 †Straparollina hudsoni
 †Straparollus
 †Straparollus clymenioides
 †Straparollus planodiscus
 †Strataster
 †Strataster maciverorum – type locality for species
 †Streblocrinus – type locality for genus
 †Streblocrinus brachiatus – type locality for species
 †Strepsodiscus
 †Strepsodiscus hoyti
 †Streptelasma
 †Streptelasma corniculum
 †Strepulites
 †Strepulites divectus – type locality for species
 †Striacoceras
 †Striacoceras typum
 †Striatochonetes
 †Striatochonetes flexuosus
 †Striatochonetes flexuousus
 †Striatochonetes setigera
 †Striatochonetes setigerus
 †Striatopora
 †Striatopora flexuosa
 †Striatostyliolina
 †Stricklandia
 †Strigigenalis
 †Strigigenalis cassinensis
 †Striispirifer
 †Striispirifer niagarensis
 †Strobeus
 †Strobeus onondagaensis
 †Stromatocerium
 †Stromatocerium rugosum
 †Stromatopora
 †Stromatopora constellata
 †Strophalosia
 †Strophalosia truncata
 †Stropheodonta
 †Stropheodonta demissa
 †Strophochonetes
 †Strophochonetes cornutus
 †Strophodonta
 †Strophodonta demissa
   †Strophomena
 †Strophomena acutiradiata
 †Strophomena conradi
 †Strophomena convexa
 †Strophomena corrugata
 †Strophomena crassa
 †Strophomena deflecta
 †Strophomena inaequistriata
 †Strophomena incurvata
 †Strophomena inequiradiata
 †Strophomena iowensis
 †Strophomena orthididea
 †Strophomena pentagonia
 †Strophomena profunda
 †Strophomena subplana
 †Strophoneila
 †Strophoneila punctulifera
 †Strophonella
 †Strophonella ampla
 †Strophonella headleyana – or unidentified comparable form
 †Strophonella leavenworthana
 †Strophonella patenta
 †Strophonella punctulifera
 †Strophonella striata
 †Strophostylus
 †Strophostylus cancellata
 †Strophostylus fitchi – type locality for species
 †Strophostylus rotundata – type locality for species
 Stylaraea
 †Stylaraea parva
 †Stylioina
 †Stylioina fissurella
 †Styliolina
 †Styliolina fissurella
 †Styliolinid
 †Stylonema
 †Stylonema robusta – type locality for species
  †Stylonurus
 †Subligaculum
 †Subligaculum aculeatus – type locality for species
 †Subligaculum laciniosum
 †Subretepora
 †Subulites
 †Subulites elongatus
 †Subulites prolongata
 †Suecoceras
 †Suecoceras marcoui
 †Sulcella
 †Sulcella emicatusa – type locality for species
 †Sulcoretepora
 †Sulcoretepora inscissurata
 †Sulcoretopera
 †Sulcoretopora
 †Sulcoretopora incisurata – or unidentified comparable form
 †Svalbardia
 †Svalbardia banksii
 †Syaptocrinus
 †Syaptocrinus nintius
 †Symphysurina
 †Symphysurina convexa
 †Symphysurina myopia – type locality for species
 †Synaptocrinus
 †Synaptocrinus nuntius
 †Synaptophyllum
 †Synaptophyllum simcoense
 †Synbathocrinus
 †Synbathocrinus canandaigua
 †Synphoria – report made of unidentified related form or using admittedly obsolete nomenclature
 †Synphoroides
 †Synphoroides pleuroptyx
 †Syringaxon
 †Syringaxon rudis
  †Syringopora

T

 †Tabulophyllum
 †Tabulophyllum orientale
   †Taeniocrada
 †Taeniocrada stilesvillensis
 †Taeniopora
 †Taeniopora exigua
 †Taineopora
 †Taonurus
 †Taonurus caudagalli
 †Tarphyceras
 †Tarphyceras clarkei
 †Tarphyceras farnsworthi
 †Tarphyceras multicameratum
 †Technophorus
 †Technophorus cancellatus – type locality for species
 †Tellinopsis
 †Tellinopsis subemarginata
 †Tellinopsis subemargula
   †Tentaculites
 †Tentaculites bellulus
 †Tentaculites elongatus
 †Tentaculites gracilis
 †Tentaculites gyracanthus
 †Tentaculites minutus
 †Tentaculites scalariformis
 †Tentaculites scaleriformis
 †Tentaculites simmondsi
 †Tentaculites spiculus
 †Tetradium
 †Tetradium cellulosum
 †Tetranodoceras
 †Tetranodoceras transversum
 †Tetranota
 †Tetranota bidorsata
 †Tetrasacculus
 †Tetrasacculus magnivelatus – or unidentified comparable form
 †Tetrasacculus paeneteichus – type locality for species
  †Tetraxylopteris
 †Tetraxylopteris BR4
 †Tetraxylopteris schmidtii
 †Thaerocrinus
 †Thaerocrinus crenatus
 †Thalamocrinus
 †Thaleops
 †Thaleops longispina – type locality for species
 †Thaleops ovata
 †Thaleops punctata
 †Thaleops raymondi
 †Thamnopora
 †Thamnoptychia
 †Thamnoptychia limbata
 †Thamnoptychia ornata
 †Thamnoptychia romingeri
 †Thiemella
 †Thiemella danbyi
 †Thiemella danybi
 †Thiemella leonensis
 †Thlipsurella – tentative report
 †Thylacocrinus
 †Thylacocrinus clarkei
 †Tormosocrinus
 †Tormosocrinus furberi
 †Tornoceras
 †Tornoceras arcuatum
 †Tornoceras typum – or unidentified comparable form
 †Tornoceras uniangulare
 †Tremanotus
 †Tremanotus angustata
 †Tremanotus profundus – type locality for species
 †Trematis
 †Trematis terminalis
 †Trematopora
 †Trematopora tuberculata
 †Trematopora tuberculosa
 †Trematospira
 †Trematospira camura
 †Trematospira gibbosa
 †Trematospira perforata – or unidentified comparable form
    †Triarthrus
 †Triarthrus becki
 †Triarthrus eatoni
 †Tricornina
 †Triendoceras
 †Triendoceras orthoseptatum
 †Trigonodictya
 †Trigonodictya acuta
 †Trigonograptus
 †Trigrammaria
 †Triloboxylon
 †Triloboxylon arnoldii
 †Triloboxylon ashlandicum
 †Trimerus
 †Trimerus delphinocephalus
 †Triplesia
 †Tripteroceras
 †Tripteroceras cariniferum – type locality for species
 †Tritonophon
 †Tritonophon trilobatus
  †Trochoceras
 †Trocholites
 †Trocholites ammonius
 †Trocholites gracilis
 †Trocholites ruedemanni
 †Trochonema
 †Trochonema dispar
 †Trochonema rectangularis
 †Trochonemella
 †Trochonemella knoxvillensis
 †Tropidocoryphe
 †Tropidocoryphe richterorum – type locality for species
 †Tropidodiscus
 †Tropidodiscus curvilineatus
 †Tropidoleptus
 †Tropidoleptus carinatus
 †Tropodus
 †Tropodus comptus
 †Truncalosia
 †Truncalosia truncata
 †Truyolsoceras
 †Truyolsoceras bicostatum – type locality for species
  †Tryblidium
 †Tryplasma
 †Tryplasma fascicularium – type locality for species
 †Tubulibairdia
 †Tubulibairdia windomensis
 †Tullypothyridina
 †Tullypothyridina venestula
 †Tylothyris
 †Tylothyris clarksvillensis
 †Tylothyris mesa
 †Tylothyris mesacostalis
 †Tylothyris mesicostalis
 †Tylothyris novamexicana
 †Tylothyris pauliformis
 †Tyserella
 †Tyserella pauliformis
 †Tytthocrinus
 †Tytthocrinus arcarius – type locality for species

U

 †Ulrichia
 †Ulrichia acricula
 †Ulrichia fragilis
 †Ulrichia illinearis
 †Ulrichia spinifera
 †Ulrichia ventura – type locality for species
 †Ulrichodina
 †Ulrichodina abnormalis
 †Ulrichostylus
 †Uncinulus
 †Uncinulus abruptus
 †Uncinulus mutabilis
 †Uncinulus nucleolatus
 †Uncinulus pyramidatus
 †Unitrypa
 †Uromystrum
 †Uromystrum brevispinum
 †Uromystrum minor

V

 †Vaginoceras
 †Vaginoceras oppletum
 †Valcourea
 †Valcourea strophomenoides
 †Valcouroceras
 †Valcouroceras bovinum
 †Valcouroceras cyclops
 †Valcouroceras elongatum – type locality for species
 †Valcouroceras obesum
 †Valcouroceras tenuiseptum
 †Vaningenoceras
 †Vaningenoceras indomitum
 †Vaningenoceras styliforme
 †Vanuxemia
 †Vanuxemia limbata
 †Variabiloconus
 †Variabiloconus bassleri
 †Variabiloconus lineatus
 †Vassaroceras
 †Vassaroceras henrietta – type locality for species
 †Velibeyrichia
 †Vermiforafacta
 †Vermiforafacta rollinsi
 †Vermiforichnus
 †Vermiforichnus clarkei
 †Vernonaspis
 †Vertumnia
 †Vertumnia reversa
 †Vetupraeca
 †Vetupraeca duplicata
 †Vetupraeca vetusta – type locality for species
 †Viriatellina
 †Vogdesia
 †Vogdesia bearsi
 †Vogdesia obtusus

W

  †Waeringopterus
 †Waeringopterus cumberlandicus
 †Waeringopterus vernonensis
 †Walcottoceras
 †Walliserodus
 †Walliserodus sancticlairi
 †Warrenella
 †Warrenella laevis
 †Warrenella magna
 †Wellsites
 †Wellsites tynani
 †Wellsites williamsi – type locality for species
 †Whidbornella
 †Whidbornella hirsuta
 †Whidbornella lachrymosa
 †Whiteavsia
 †Whiteavsia expansa
 †Whiteavsia undata
 †Whitfieldella
 †Whitfieldella cylindrica
 †Whitfieldella intermedia
 †Whitfieldella naviformis
 †Whitfieldella naviormis
 †Whitfieldella nitida
 †Whitfieldella oblata
 †Whitfieldia – tentative report
 †Whitfieldoceras
 †Whitfieldoceras lenticontractum – type locality for species
 †Wurmiella
 †Wurmiella excavata

X

 †Xenocladia
 †Xenocladia medullosina
 †Xystostrophia
 †Xystostrophia woolworthana

Y

  †Yochelcionella
 †Yochelcionella greenlandica
 †Yochelsonella – type locality for genus
 †Yochelsonella compressa – type locality for species
 †Yorba

Z

 †Zaphrenthis
 †Zaphrenthis bilateralis
 †Zaphrenthis turbinata
 †Zittelloceras
 †Zittelloceras praecedens – type locality for species
   †Zoophycos
 †Zostocrinus
 †Zostocrinus ornatus
 †Zygobolba
 †Zygobolba crta
 †Zygobolba curta
 †Zygobolba decora
 †Zygobolba elongata – tentative report
 †Zygobolba excavata
 †Zygobolba inflata
 †Zygobolba intermedia
 †Zygobolba oblonga
 †Zygobolba prolixa
 †Zygobolba rectangula
 †Zygobolba robusta
 †Zygobolbina
 †Zygobolbina conradi
 †Zygosella
 †Zygosella vallata – or unidentified comparable form
 †Zygospira
 †Zygospira modesta

References
 

Paleozoic
New York